= List of French philosophers =

The following is a list of notable French philosophers.

== List ==
Organized by century of birth; alphabetized by surname within each century

=== 11th century ===
- Pierre Abélard
- Anselm of Laon
- Guillaume de Champeaux
- Bernard of Chartres
- Thierry de Chartres
- Guillaume de Conches
- Pierre Lombard
- Manegold of Lautenbach
- Gilbert de la Porrée
- Roscelin de Compiègne
- Theobald of Étampes

=== 12th century ===
- Amaury de Chartres
- David de Dinan

=== 13th century ===
- Nicolas d'Autrecourt
- Bonaventure
- Durandus of Saint-Pourçain

=== 14th century ===
- Pierre d'Ailly
- Jean Buridan
- Nicole Oresme

=== 15th century ===
- Charles de Bovelles

=== 16th century ===
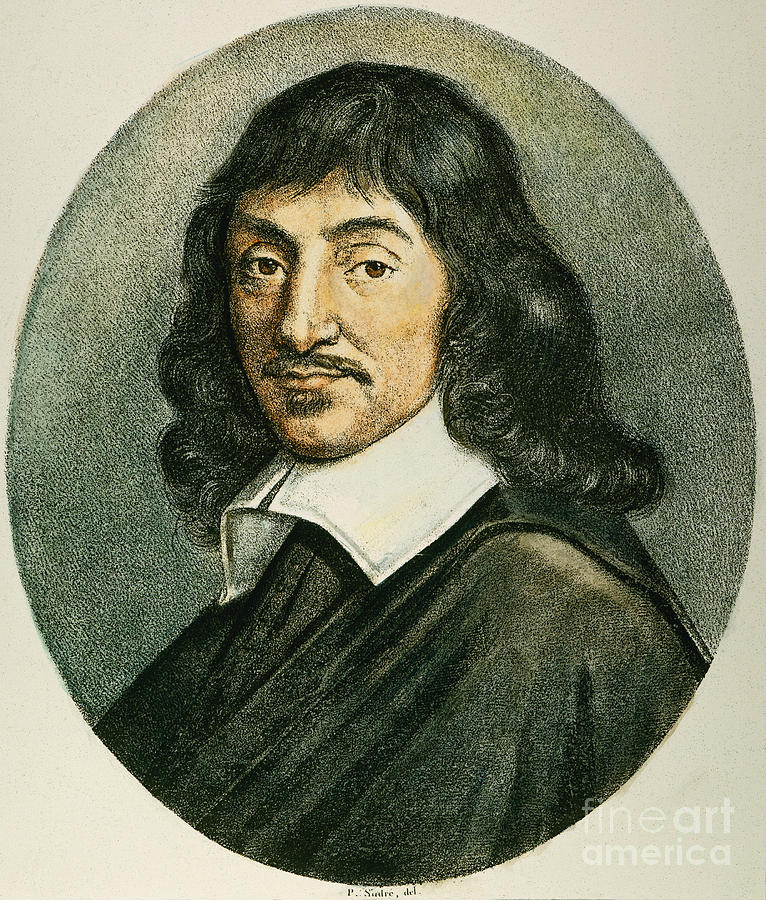
René Descartes (1596-1650)

- Guillaume Bigot
- Jean Bodin
- Pierre Charron
- René Descartes
- Pierre Gassendi
- Étienne de La Boétie
- François de La Mothe Le Vayer
- Pierre de la Place
- Marin Mersenne
- Michel de Montaigne
- Marc Antoine Muret
- Gabriel Naudé
- Pierre de La Ramée
- Jean de Silhon

=== 17th century ===
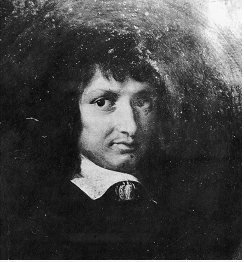
Blaise Pascal (1623-1662)

- Antoine Arnauld
- Pierre Bayle
- François Bernier
- Claude Brunet
- Claude Buffier
- Charles-Irénée Castel de Saint-Pierre
- Géraud de Cordemoy
- Marin Cureau de La Chambre
- John Theophilus Desaguliers
- Jean Domat
- César Chesneau Dumarsais
- Fénelon
- Pierre de Fermat
- Simon Foucher
- Nicolas Fréret
- Jacques Gaffarel
- Pierre-Daniel Huet
- Charles-Etienne Jordan
- Louis de La Forge
- Bernard Lamy
- Antoine Legrand
- Pierre-Sylvain Régis
- Nicolas Malebranche
- Jean Meslier
- Montesquieu
- Blaise Pascal
- François Poullain de la Barre
- Charles de Saint-Évremond
- Samuel Sorbière
- Voltaire

=== 18th century ===
- Pierre Hyacinthe Azais
- Charles Batteux
- Louis Eugène Marie Bautain
- Maine de Biran
- Louis de Bonald
- Nicolas Antoine Boulanger
- Pierre Jean Georges Cabanis
- Auguste Comte
- Étienne Bonnot de Condillac
- Nicolas de Condorcet
- Benjamin Constant
- Victor Cousin
- Jean le Rond D'Alembert
- Étienne Noël Damilaville
- Jean Philibert Damiron
- Jean-Baptiste-Claude Delisle de Sales
- Léger Marie Deschamps
- Antoine-Louis-Claude Destutt de Tracy
- Denis Diderot
- Joseph Droz
- Charles Fourier
- Jean-Baptiste Cousin de Grainville
- Claude-Adrien Helvétius
- Josef Hoëné-Wronski
- Paul Henri Thiry d'Holbach
- Louis de Jaucourt
- Théodore Simon Jouffroy
- Joseph Lakanal
- Félicité Robert de Lamennais
- Julien Offray de La Mettrie
- Pierre Laromiguière
- Antoine Lavoisier
- Gabriel Bonnot de Mably
- Victor Riqueti de Mirabeau
- Étienne-Gabriel Morelly
- Antoine Chrysostome Quatremère de Quincy
- Charles de Rémusat
- Jean-Baptiste Robinet
- Jean-Jacques Rousseau
- Louis-Claude de Saint-Martin
- Claude Henri de Rouvroy de Saint-Simon
- Alexandre Savérien
- Emmanuel Joseph Sieyès

=== 19th century ===
==== 1800s ====
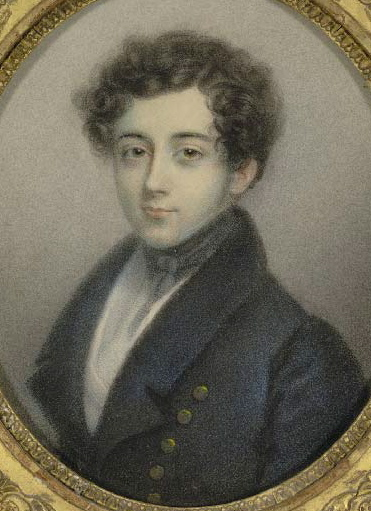
Alexis de Tocqueville (1805-1859)

- Jules Barthélemy-Saint-Hilaire
- Frédéric Bastiat
- Victor Considerant
- Antoine-Augustin Cournot
- Théodore Dézamy
- Charles Duveyrier
- Émile Littré
- Jean Reynaud
- Alexis de Tocqueville
- Étienne Vacherot

==== 1810s ====
- Antoine Blanc de Saint-Bonnet
- Francisque Bouillier
- Joseph Arthur de Gobineau
- Jules Lequier
- Charles de Montalembert
- Félix Ravaisson
- Charles Renouvier
- Émile Saisset
- Jules Simon
- Augusto Vera
- Charles Waddington

==== 1820s ====
- Émile Beaussire
- Elme-Marie Caro
- Paul Janet
- Jean-Félix Nourrisson
- Ernest Renan
- Hippolyte Taine

==== 1830s ====
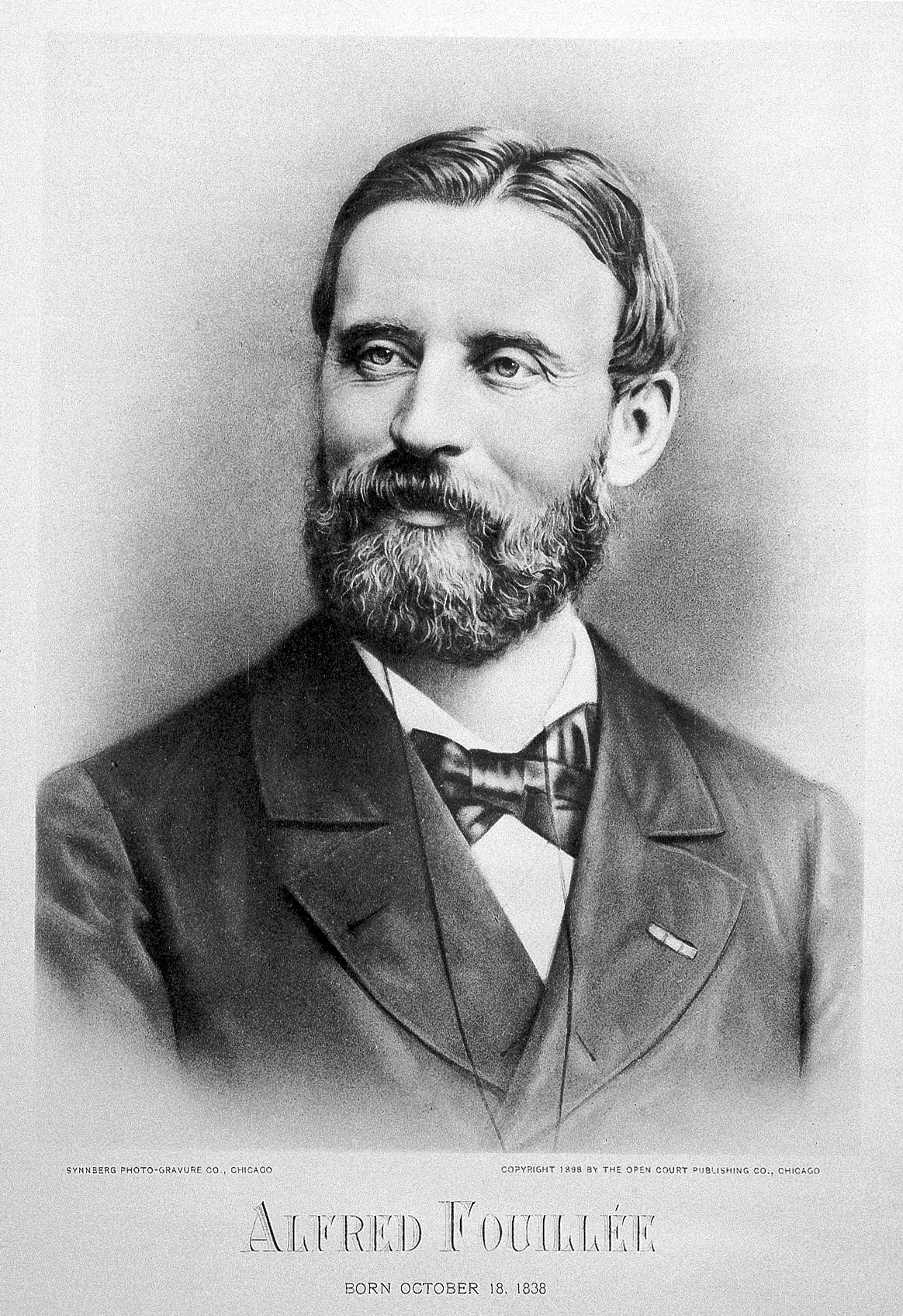
Alfred Fouillée (1838-1912)

- Alfred Fouillée
- Auguste Laugel

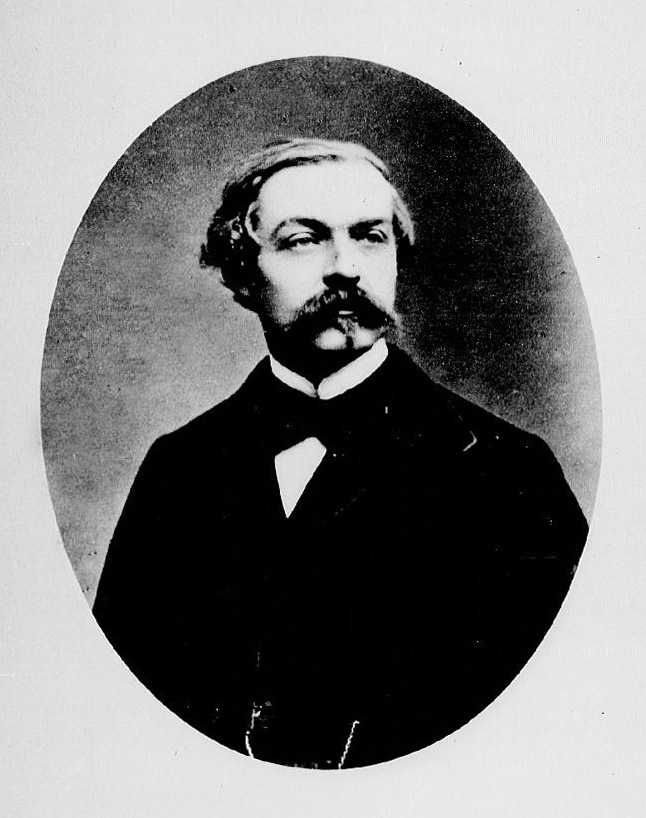
Auguste Laugel (1830-1914)

==== 1840s ====
- Émile Boutroux
- Victor Brochard
- Lionel Dauriac
- Georges Sorel
- Gabriel Tarde

==== 1850s ====
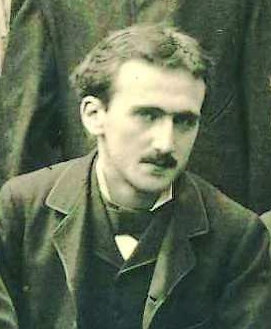
Henri Bergson (1859-1941)

- Gustave Belot
- Henri Bergson
- Jules de Gaultier
- Jean-Marie Guyau
- Octave Hamelin
- Pierre Janet
- Lucien Lévy-Bruhl
- Émile Meyerson
- Gaston Milhaud
- Frédéric Paulhan
- François Picavet

==== 1860s ====
- Alain
- Victor Basch
- Julien Benda
- Henri Berr
- Maurice Blondel
- Léon Brunschvicg
- Louis Couturat
- Victor Delbos
- André Lalande
- Xavier Léon
- Charles Maurras
- Georges Palante
- Léon Robin
- Théodore Ruyssen
- Han Ryner
- Antonin-Gilbert Sertillanges

==== 1870s ====
- Nikolai Berdyaev
- Célestin Bouglé
- Ricciotto Canudo
- Félicien Challaye
- Paul-Louis Couchoud
- Henri Delacroix
- Edmond Fleg
- Élie Halévy
- Gérard de Lacaze-Duthiers
- Charles Lalo
- Édouard Le Roy
- Dominique Parodi
- Maurice Pradines
- Jacques Rennes
- Albert Schweitzer
- Paul Valéry
- Henri Wallon
- Léontine Zanta

==== 1880s ====
Jacques Chevalier (1882-1962) (Attribution: Studio Harcourt)

- Gaston Bachelard
- Jacques Chevalier
- Étienne Gilson
- Bernard Groethuysen
- René Guénon
- Émile Lasbax
- Louis Lavelle
- Pierre Lecomte du Noüy
- René Le Senne
- Gabriel Marcel
- Jacques Maritain
- Paul Masson-Oursel
- Louis Rougier
- Albert Spaier
- Pierre Teilhard de Chardin
- Jean Wahl

==== 1890s ====
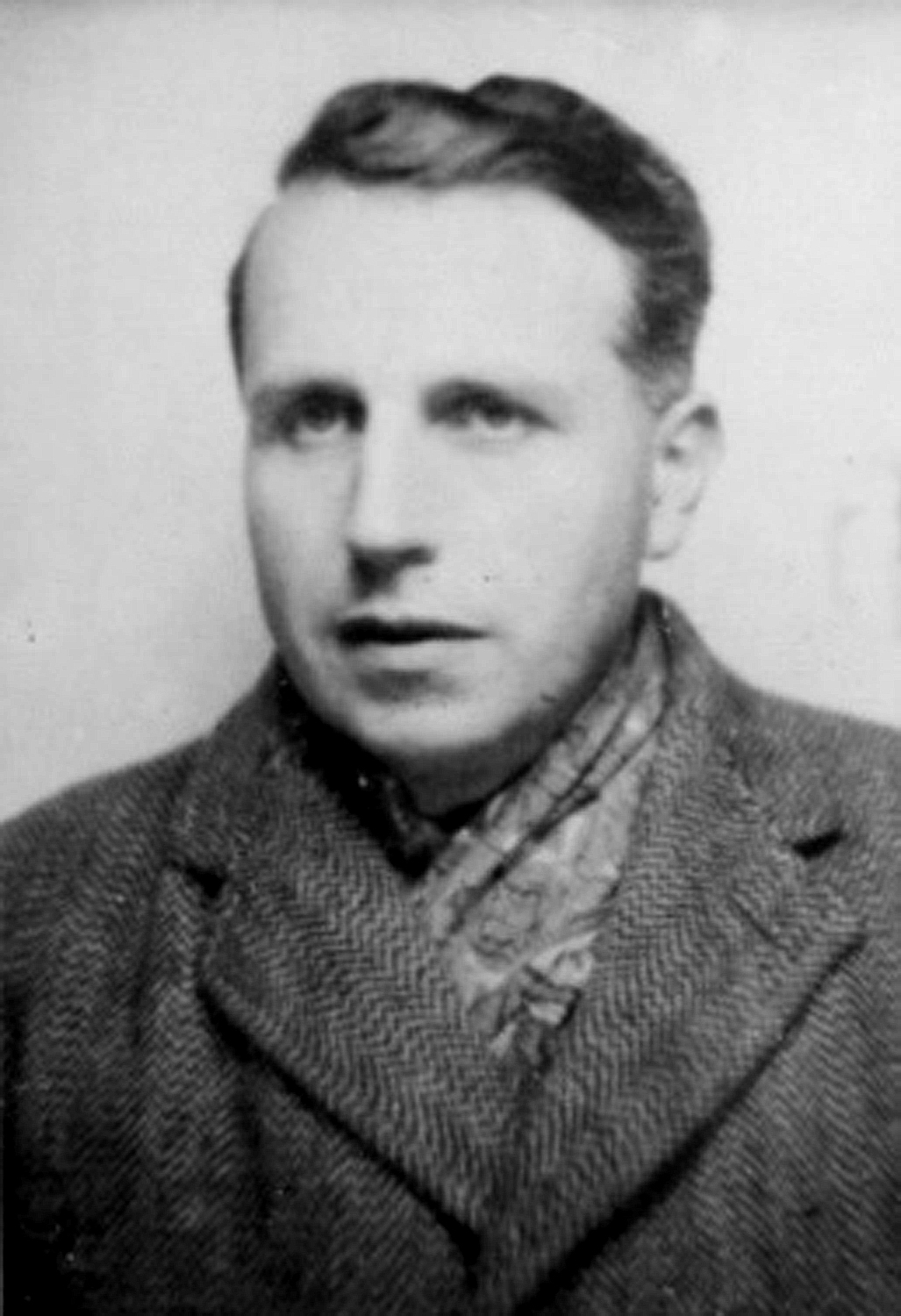
Georges Bataille (1897-1962)

- Georges Bataille
- Gaston Berger
- Robert Blanché
- André-Jean Festugière
- Henri Gouhier
- Jean Grenier
- Martial Guéroult
- Alexandre Koyré
- Régis Messac
- Jean Nicod
- Brice Parain
- Jean Rostand
- Étienne Souriau

=== 20th century ===
==== 1900s ====
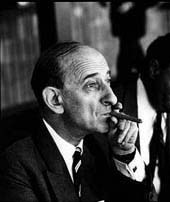
Raymond Aron (1905-1983) (Attribution: Erling Mandelmann)

- Raymond Abellio
- Ferdinand Alquié
- Raymond Aron
- Jean Beaufret
- Simone de Beauvoir
- Maurice Blanchot
- Étienne Borne
- Georges Canguilhem
- Jean Cavaillès
- Henry Corbin
- Jean Daujat
- Maurice de Gandillac
- Jean Guitton
- Jean Hyppolite
- Vladimir Jankélévitch
- Raymond Klibansky
- Pierre Klossowski
- Alexandre Kojève
- Albert Lautman
- Henri Lefebvre
- Claude Lévi-Strauss
- Emmanuel Levinas
- Alexandre Marc
- René Ménil
- Maurice Merleau-Ponty
- Emmanuel Mounier
- Paul-Yves Nizan
- Georges Politzer
- Raymond Ruyer
- Jean-Paul Sartre
- Gustave Thibon
- Éric Weil
- Simone Weil

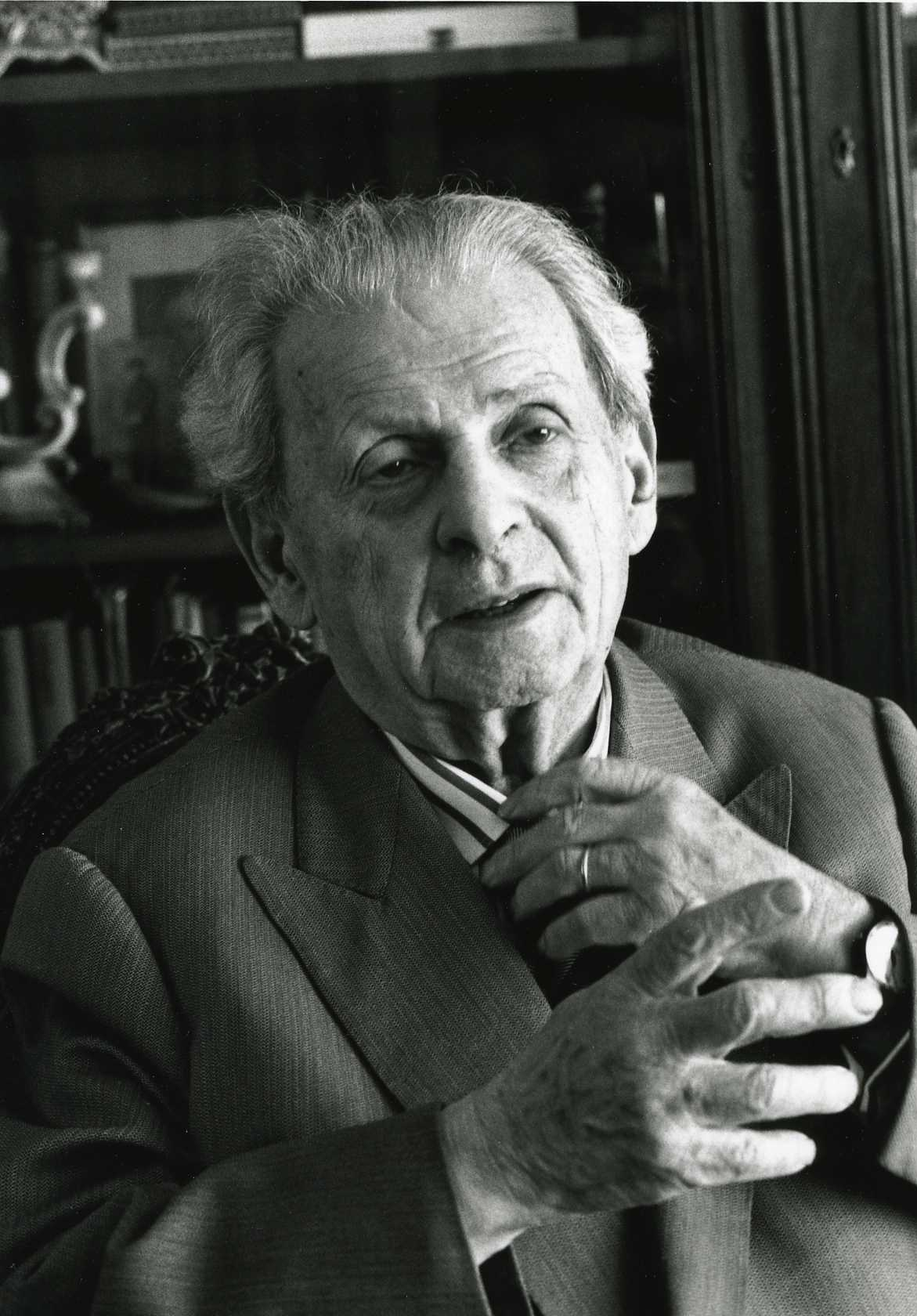
Emmanuel Levinas (1906-1995) in 1991 (Attribution: Bracha L. Ettinger)

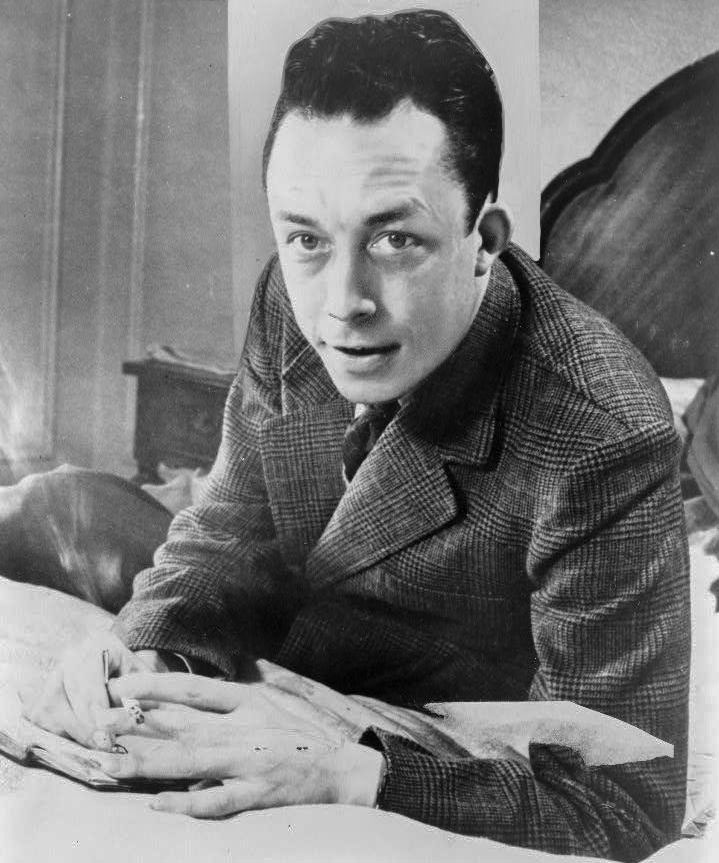
Albert Camus (1913-1960)

==== 1910s ====
- Louis Althusser
- Suzanne Bachelard
- Roland Barthes
- Pierre Boutang
- Albert Camus
- Albert Caraco
- Bernard Charbonneau
- Paul Chauchard
- Emil Cioran
- Jean-Toussaint Desanti
- Mikel Dufrenne
- Jacques Ellul
- Joseph Gabel
- Roger Garaudy
- Lucien Goldmann
- Victor Goldschmidt
- Henri Laborit
- André Neher
- Raymond Polin
- Paul Ricœur
- Joseph Rovan
- Marc Soriano

==== 1920s ====
- Kostas Axelos
- Jean Baudrillard
- Mayotte Bollack
- Jean-Yves Calvez
- Cornelius Castoriadis
- Jean-Émile Charon
- François Châtelet
- Michel Clouscard
- Marcel Conche
- François Dagognet
- Hubert Damisch
- Gilles Deleuze
- Jean-Marie Domenach
- Marcel-Jacques Dubois
- Gilbert Durand
- Frantz Fanon
- Jean-Pierre Faye
- Michel Foucault
- René Girard
- André Gorz
- Pierre Hadot
- Michel Henry
- Albert Jacquard
- Francis Jeanson
- Lucien Jerphagnon
- Jean Jolivet
- Antoine de La Garanderie
- Bianca Lamblin
- Jean Laplanche
- Claude Lefort
- Jean-François Lyotard
- André Malet
- Robert Misrahi
- Edgar Morin
- Jean-Bertrand Pontalis
- Jean-François Revel
- Pierre Sansot
- René Schérer
- Gilbert Simondon
- George Steiner
- Xavier Tilliette
- Claude Tresmontant
- Jules Vuillemin
- François Wahl

==== 1930s ====
- Alain Badiou
- Jacques Bidet
- Jean Borella
- Pierre Bourdieu
- Christine Buci-Glucksmann
- Daniel Charles
- Hélène Cixous
- Catherine Clément
- Michel Deguy
- Jacques Derrida
- Oswald Ducrot
- Pierre Fédida
- Jacques Garelli
- André Glucksmann
- Gérard Granel
- Nicolas Grimaldi
- Félix Guattari
- Michel Hulin
- Claude Imbert
- Luce Irigaray
- Dominique Janicaud
- Sarah Kofman
- François Laruelle
- Pierre Macherey
- Louis Marin
- Rafaël Pividal
- Nicos Poulantzas
- Clément Rosset
- Judith E. Schlanger
- Michel Serres
- André Tubeuf
- Jean-Marie Vincent
- Paul Virilio
- Jean-Pierre Voyer

==== 1940s ====
- Sylviane Agacinski
- Élisabeth Badinter
- Étienne Balibar
- Jean C. Baudet
- Alain de Benoist
- Daniel Bensaïd
- Jean-Michel Berthelot
- Estelle Binant
- Jacques Bouveresse
- Rémi Brague
- Jean-Marie Brohm
- Barbara Cassin
- Catherine Chalier
- Georges Chapouthier
- Gilles Châtelet
- Françoise Dastur
- Chantal Delsol
- Philippe Descola
- Vincent Descombes
- Roger-Pol Droit
- Dany-Robert Dufour
- Hugues Dufourt
- Jean-Pierre Dupuy
- Jean-Marc Ferry
- Alain Finkielkraut
- Geneviève Fraisse
- Marcel Gauchet
- Julia Kristeva
- Philippe Lacoue-Labarthe
- Bruno Latour
- Dominique Lecourt
- Benny Lévy
- Bernard-Henri Lévy
- Jean-Marc Lévy-Leblond
- Jacqueline Lichtenstein
- Gilles Lipovetsky
- Robert Maggiori
- Michel Malherbe
- Pierre Manent
- Jean-Luc Marion
- Jean-François Mattéi
- Philippe Muray
- Jean-Luc Nancy
- Philippe Nys
- Ruwen Ogien
- Pierre Péju
- Jacques Rancière
- Gérard Raulet
- Pierre A. Riffard
- Rainer Rochlitz
- Pierre-André Taguieff
- Jean-Louis Vieillard-Baron
- Marlène Zarader

==== 1950s ====
- Bernard Andrieu
- Renaud Barbaras
- Gilles Bernheim
- Jean-Michel Besnier
- Michel Bitbol
- Mikkel Borch-Jacobsen
- Dominique Bourg
- Monique Canto-Sperber
- Jean Clam
- André Comte-Sponville
- Georges Didi-Huberman
- Pascal Engel
- Didier Eribon
- Alain Etchegoyen
- Michel Fattal
- Luc Ferry
- Marc Froment-Meurice
- Michel Féher
- François Jullien
- Denis Kambouchner
- Jean Lacoste
- Maurizio Lazzarato
- Pierre Lévy
- Catherine Malabou
- François Noudelmann
- Michel Onfray
- Marc-Alain Ouaknin
- Catherine Perret
- Richard Pinhas
- Robert Redeker
- Yves Roucaute
- Philippe-Joseph Salazar
- Georges-Elia Sarfati
- Frédéric Schiffter
- Jean Soldini
- Bernard Stiegler
- Michel Surya

==== 1960s ====
- Isabelle Alfandary
- Paul Audi
- Étienne Bimbenet
- Fabienne Brugère
- Alain Cophignon
- Marc Crépon
- Vincent Delecroix
- Natalie Depraz
- Anne Dufourmantelle
- Éric Fiat
- Franck Fischbach
- Camille Froidevaux-Metterie
- Frédéric Gros
- Alexandra Laignel-Lavastine
- Sandra Laugier
- Frédéric Lordon
- Quentin Meillassoux
- Fréderic Neyrat
- Corine Pelluchon
- Fred Poché
- Judith Revel
- Alexis Rosenbaum
- Anne Sauvagnargues
- Patrick Savidan
- Peter Szendy
- Raphaël Zagury-Orly
- François Zourabichvili

==== 1970s ====
- Gwenaëlle Aubry
- Serge Audier
- Abdennour Bidar
- Jean-Baptiste Brenet
- Maxence Caron
- Vincent Cespedes
- Estelle Ferrarese
- Claire Marin
- Géraldine Muhlmann
- Camille Riquier
- Gabriel Rockhill

==== 1980s ====
- Manon Garcia
- Marie Garrau

== See also ==
Pages listing many French philosophers

- Collège de France
- Collège international de philosophie
- Grand prix de philosophie
- Les Rencontres Philosophiques de Monaco
