= Marie Garrau =

French social philosopher and ethicist

- Born: 1980 (age 45–46)
- Awards: 2019 PhiloMonaco Essay Prize

Education
- Education: École normale supérieure de Lyon
- Alma mater: Paris Nanterre University
- Doctoral advisor: Christian Lazzeri

Philosophical work
- Era: Contemporary philosophy
- Region: Western philosophy
- School: Feminist philosophy Critical theory
- Institutions: Paris 1 Panthéon-Sorbonne University
- Main interests: Social philosophy, political philosophy, ethics of care, vulnerability, autonomy, social justice, Social dominance theory
- Notable ideas: Relational autonomy

Marie Garrau is a French social and political philosopher, and a professor at University Paris 1 Panthéon-Sorbonne.

Her thesis was titled, L'importance de la vulnérabilité. Essai sur le rôle et la signification de la catégorie de vulnérabilité dans la philosophie morale et politique contemporaine. She defended it in 2011 under the supervision of Christian Lazzeri at Paris Nanterre University. At the university, she is director of the Master 2 ETHIRES (Ethique appliquée responsabilité sociale et environmental and a researcher at the Institut des sciences juridique et philosophique de la Sorbonne (ISJPS). (Note: The ISJPS is, in English translation, the Institute of Legal and Philosophical Sciences.)

In 2019, she won the annual essay prize from Les Rencontres Philosophiques de Monaco for her book Politiques de la vulnérabilité (CNRS Éditions, 2018).

Her work focuses on the ethics of care, as it was conceived in the 1980s by Carol Gilligan and later appeared in France around the turn of the century to be endorsed by Sandra Laugier. In a talk for PhiloMonaco in 2021, she cited an opinion piece written by Martine Aubry in Le Monde where she mentioned Aubry's idea of a "society of care," and proceeded to analyze the ways that social discourse tries to undermine and dismiss the need for care and the act of care. This, she said, gives us an opportunity to reevaluate our conceptions of ethics and politics. Garrau argues that care is a universal and increasingly common (and arguably urgent) concern, but too often it is hidden and denied. She stresses her theory of relational autonomy: the idea that autonomy does not arise from self-sufficiency, but is made possible by relationships, institutions, and forms of care that often remain invisible. These concealed dependencies can allow some people to appear invulnerable.

== Essays ==
- “De Notre Responsabilité Pour La Justice: Penser Le Politique Avec Iris Marion Young Avant-Propos.” Archives de Philosophie 85, no. 3 (2022): 5–12. https://www.jstor.org/stable/27229053.
- “De La Possibilité d’une Phénoménologie Féministe Retour Sur l’approche d’Iris Marion Young.” Revue Philosophique de Louvain 116, no. 4 (2018): 517–44.
- with Isabelle Aubert, and Sophie Guérard de Latour. “Penser Avec Iris Marion Young Introduction.” Revue Philosophique de Louvain 116, no. 4 (2018): 487–91. https://www.jstor.org/stable/26757557.
- with Cécile Laborde. "Relational equality, non-domination, and vulnerability." (2015).
- with Alice Le Goff. "Vulnérabilité, non-domination et autonomie : l’apport du néorépublicanisme." Astérion: Philosophie, histoire des idées, pensée politique. June 2009.

== Books ==
- Expériences vécues du genre et de la race: Pour une phénoménologie critique. France: Éditions de la Sorbonne, 2024. ISBN 9791035108007.
- Decentering Epistemologies and Challenging Privilege: Critical Care Ethics Perspectives. UK: Rutgers University Press, 2024.
- Multiple contributors. La justice, la vulnérabilité et le politique autrement. Canada: Presses de l'Université Laval, 2022.
- Politiques de la vulnérabilité. France, CNRS editions, 2018. ISBN 9782356871534.
- with Delphine Prévost. La Liberté négative. Usages et critiques. Éditions Hermann. 2018. ISBN 9782705695224.
- Care et attention. France: Presses universitaires de France, 2014. ISBN 9782130618539.
- with Alice le Goff. Care, justice et dépendance: Introduction aux théories du care. France: Presses Universitaires de France, 2010. ISBN 9782356871534.
- with Cécile Laborde. "Relational equality, non-domination, and vulnerability." (2015).
