= Schlanger =

Schlanger is the surname of the following people:

- Gregg Schlanger, Chair of the Department of Art at Central Washington University, U.S.
- Judith E. Schlanger (born 1936), French writer and philosopher
- Margo Schlanger (born 1967), American lawyer
- Melanie Schlanger (born 1986), Australian freestyle swimmer
- Talia Schlanger, Canadian radio broadcaster
