= Rennes (disambiguation) =

Rennes is the capital city of the region of Brittany in northwestern France.

Rennes or Rennais may also refer to:

== Geography ==
- Rennes-le-Château, commune in the region of Occitanie in southern France
- Rennes-les-Bains, commune in the region of Occitanie in southern France
- Rennes-en-Grenouilles, commune in the region of Pays de la Loire in northwestern France
- Rennes-sur-Loue, commune in the region of Bourgogne-Franche-Comté in eastern France
- Rennes station (Paris Metro), a Paris Metro station
- Rue de Rennes, main street in the 6th arrondissement of Paris, France

== People ==
- Catharina van Rennes (1858-1940), Dutch music educator, soprano singer, and composer
- Conan I of Rennes, Count of Rennes in 970
- Didier of Rennes, 7th-century bishop
- Jacques Rennes, French philosopher and veterinarian
- Juliette Rennes (born 1976), French sociologist

== Other uses ==
- University of Rennes, established in 1885, now known as University of Rennes 1 and University of Rennes 2
- Stade Rennais F.C., French football club
- Radio Rennes Bretagne, radio station that broadcast programs in the Breton language during the German occupation of France during World War II
- 6190 Rennes, asteroid
- Rennes, fictional character in the 1997 film Cube
