= Nicolas Bouleau =

French mathematician

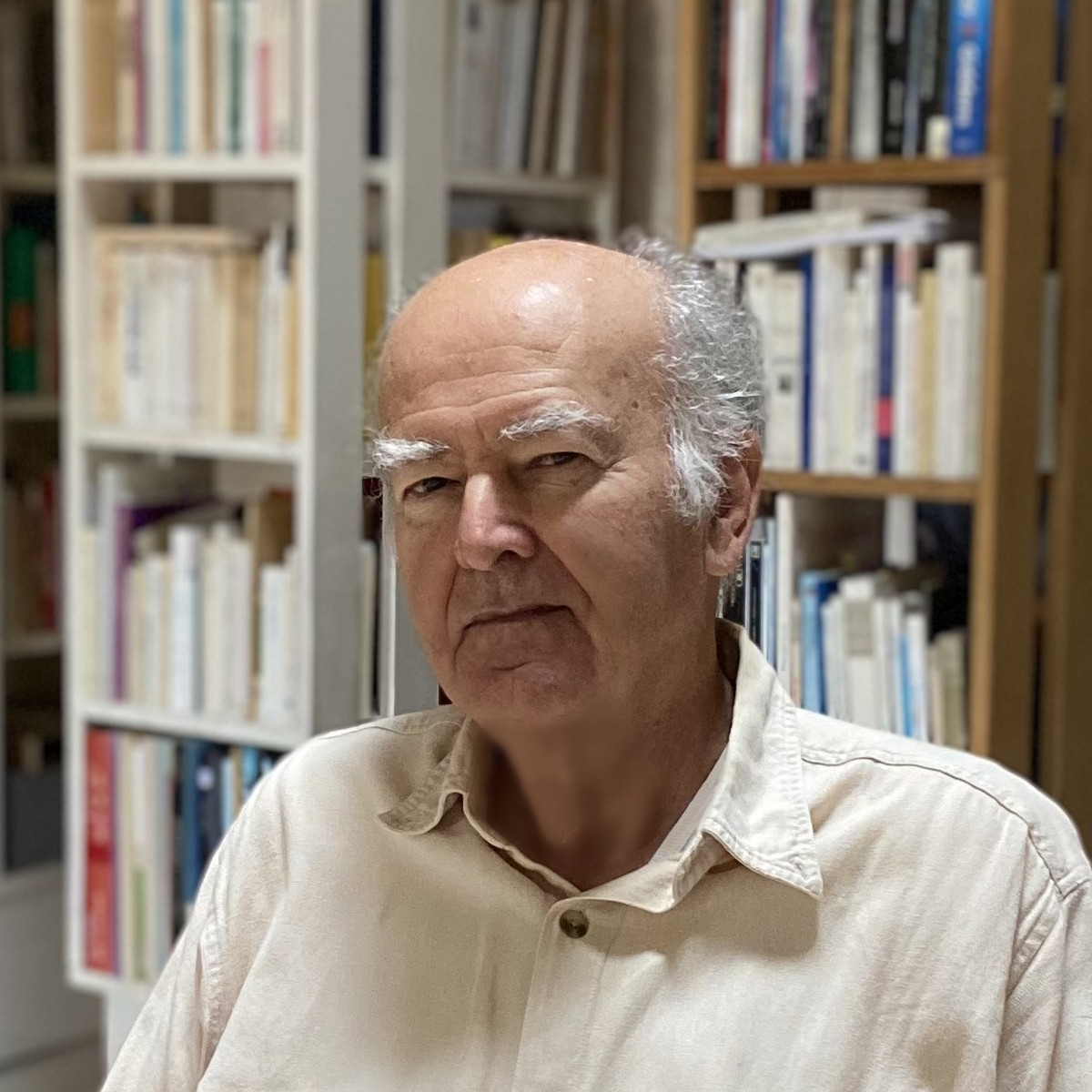
- Born: 20 May 1945 (age 81); Paris, France
- Education: École polytechnique
- Known for: Necessary and sufficient topology for continuous functions to converge to a continuous function., With Francis Hirsch, the Energy Image Density conjecture, Theory of errors, Probabilistic visco-elastic mechanics
- Awards: Montyon Prize (French Academy of Sciences) (1994); Prix Turgot (1998)
- Scientific career
- Fields: Mathematics; Philosophy
- Workplaces: École des ponts ParisTech; Paris VI Pierre and Marie Curie University; Paris 1 Panthéon-Sorbonne University; Sciences Po; Société mathématique de France
- Doctoral advisor: Laurent Schwartz

Nicolas Bouleau is a French mathematician whose essays and responsibilities have taken him into other fields such as architecture, economics, biology and philosophy. The common thread is interpretation. Heterodox understanding of a situation, a text, a program or a theorem is for him at the heart of the research activity. His most recent essays focus on biology, where he proposes a dictionary between the work of the mathematician and that of the synthetic biologist.

== Biography ==
His scientific career began after six years of ordinary service as a state civil engineer. It was described by Raphael Larrère in the preface to Penser l'éventuel and by Dominique Bourg in Science et prudence . His main professors were Laurent Schwartz, Jacques Neveu, Gustave Choquet, Paul-André Meyer. He was the founder of the mathematics research center at École des Ponts ParisTech, then its director for ten years. He was a founding member of the journal Potential Analysis and editor-in-chief of Annales des Ponts et Chaussées. He taught at the École des Ponts ParisTech, the universities Paris VI and Paris 1 Panthéon-Sorbonne University, and the Institut d'Etudes Politiques de Paris. He delivered over two hundred lectures and gave guest courses at the universities of Kyoto and Osaka (Japan), Swansea (UK), Rome (Italy) and Rabat (Morocco). He is now retired and devotes his time to the environment. He denounces the fact that the volatility of financial markets erases information on resource scarcity

== Selected bibliography ==
=== Books in English ===
- Dirichlet forms and analysis on Wiener space with Francis Hirsch, De Gruyter, 1991. ISBN 3110129191
- Numerical methods for stochastic processes with Dominique Lépingle, Wiley and Sons, 1994. ISBN 978-0471546412
- Financial Markets and Martingales, Springer 2003. ISBN 1852335823
- Error Calculus for Finance and Physics, the Language of Dirichlet Forms, De Gruyter, 2003. ISBN 3110180367
- Risk and Meaning, Springer, 2011. ISBN 978-3642176470
- Dirichlet Forms Methods for Poisson Point Measures and Lévy Processes with Laurent Denis, Springer, 2015. ISBN 9783319258188
- The Mathematics of Errors, 448 pages, Springer Nature, 2021. ISBN 978-3-030-88574-8

=== Philosophy of sciences ===
- Cinq conférences sur l'indécidabilité, coll. with J-Y. Girard and A. Louveau, Presses de l'École des Ponts, 1983. ISBN 2859780556
- Dialogues autour de la création mathématique, coll. with Laurent Schwartz, Gustave Choquet, Paul Malliavin, Paul-André Meyer, David Nualart, Nicole El Karoui, Richard Gundy, Masatoshi Fukushima, Denis Feyel, Gabriel Mokobodzki, Association Laplace-Gauss, 1997, ISBN 2951148518, rééd. Spartacus IDH, 2015. ISBN 9782366930085
- Introduction à la philosophie des sciences, Spartacus IDH, 2017. ISBN 9782366930245

=== Essays ===
- La règle, le compas et le divan, Le Seuil, 2002. ISBN 2020499991
- La modélisation critique, Quae, 2014. ISBN 978-2759221998
- Penser l'éventuel. Faire entrer les craintes dans le travail scientifique, Quae, 2017. ISBN 978-2-75922-546-0
- Le mensonge de la finance, les mathématiques, le signal-prix, et la planète, L'Atelier, 2018. ISBN 9782708245556
- Ce que Nature sait. La révolution combinatoire de la biologie et ses dangers, Presses Universitaires de France, 2021. ISBN 9782130826989
- Science et prudence. Du réductionnisme et autres erreurs par gros temps écologique, with Dominique Bourg, Presses Universitaires de France, 2022, 213 p. ISBN 978-2-13-083769-5
- Le hasard et l'évolution, Presses Universitaires de France, 2024, 228 p. ISBN 978-2-13-086912-2
