= Revue philosophique =

Revue philosophique may refer to:

- Revue philosophique de la France et de l'étranger, a French philosophy journal founded in 1876
- Revue Philosophique de Louvain, a French philosophy journal founded in 1894
