= Rochlitz (disambiguation) =

Rochlitz may refer to:

- Rochlitz, town in Saxony, Germany
- Rokytnice nad Jizerou (Rochlitz an der Iser), town in Northern Bohemia, Czech Republic
- Johann Friedrich Rochlitz
- Gustav Rochlitz
- Rainer Rochlitz (1946-2002), French translator and historian
