= Étienne Souriau =

French philosopher

- Born: 26 April 1892; Lille, France
- Died: 19 November 1979 (aged 87); Paris, France
- Spouse: Suzanne Le Goupils
- Children: 2, including Anne
- Father: Paul Souriau

Education
- Education: École Normale Supérieure

Philosophical work
- Era: 20th-century philosophy
- Region: Western philosophy
- School: Continental philosophy French spiritualism
- Institutions: University of Aix-en-Provence; University of Lyon; University of Paris
- Doctoral students: Maximiani Portas; Éric Rohmer; Bernard Teyssèdre
- Main interests: Aesthetics, metaphysics
- Notable ideas: Filmic universe

Étienne Souriau (French: [etjɛn suʁjo]; April 26, 1892 – November 19, 1979) was a French philosopher, best known for his work in aesthetics. He was a proponent of French spiritualism.

== Biography ==
Son of Paul Souriau, he studied at the École Normale Supérieure and received his agrégation of philosophy in 1925. After teaching at the universities of Aix-en-Provence and Lyon, he eventually became a professor at the Sorbonne, where he held a chair in aesthetics. He was the editor of the Revue d'esthétique and was elected to the Académie des sciences morales et politiques in 1958.

Recently, the works of Bruno Latour have reawoken interests on Souriau's oeuvre, specially his works on metaphysics regarding his theories of different modes of existence.

== Works ==
- L'Abstraction sentimentale, 1925
- L'Avenir de l'esthétique : essai sur l'objet d'une science naissante, F. Alcan, Coll. « Biblio. de Philosophie Contemporaine », 1929
- L'Instauration philosophique, 1939
- Les Différents modes d'existence, 1943 (new edition 2009)
- La Correspondance des arts, 1947
- L'Ombre de dieu, 1955
- Poésie française et la Peinture, 1966
- Clefs pour l'esthétique, 1970
- La Couronne d'herbes, 1975
- La Correspondance des arts, science de l'homme: éléments d'esthétique comparée, 1969
- L'Avenir de la philosophie, Gallimard, coll. « Idées », 1982
- Les Deux Cent Mille Situations dramatiques, Flammarion, Paris, 1950
- L'Univers filmique, 1953

Collaborations

- Esthétique industrielle, avec Charles Lalo et d'autres, articles parus dans la Revue d'esthétique, juillet-décembre 1951
- Vocabulaire d'esthétique, avec Anne Souriau, PUF, coll. « Quadrige », 2004

== Sources ==
- Luce de Vitry-Maubrey, La pensée cosmologique d'Étienne Souriau, Paris, Klincksieck, 1974.
