= Paul Souriau =

French philosopher (1852–1926)

- Born: 21 October 1852; Douai, France
- Died: 21 June 1926 (aged 73); Nancy, France
- Children: 4, including Étienne

Education
- Education: École Normale Supérieure; University of Paris

Philosophical work
- Era: 19th-century philosophy
- Region: Western philosophy
- School: Rationalism
- Institutions: University of Douai; University of Nancy
- Main interests: Aesthetics, philosophy of perception, invention theory
- Notable ideas: Aesthetics of movement

Paul Souriau (French: [pɔl suʁjo]; 1852–1926) was a French philosopher known for his works on aesthetics, philosophy of perception, and invention theory.

== Biography ==
He studied at the École Normale Supérieure and the University of Paris where he wrote a doctoral thesis entitled Théorie de l'invention published in 1881 and defended in 1882. In his thesis, he argues that inventions are not the result of a rigorous scientific method but rather come as a deterministic consequence of a set of conditions in which the inventor lives. This theory was contested very soon after its publication in the 1882 edition of the Revue Internationale de l'Enseignement. The French thesis was created simultaneously with a Latin thesis titled De motus perceptione. The Latin thesis emphasized the importance of vision in movement perception, hence the initial title De visione motus. The thesis was a precursor for his later works on movement perception.

He became a professor at the Faculté des Lettres of the University of Douai (now University of Lille) very soon after its foundation in 1887. In 1889, he published his reflections on the aesthetics of movement. The book described two levels of movement aesthetics: the mechanical beauty (the adaptation of the movement to fulfil its goal) and the movement expression (the meaning of the movement for an observer). By doing so Souriau distinguished movement from perception of movement, two concepts which later became the subjects of studies of motor cognition and psychophysics. A few years after this publication, in 1892, Souriau's wife gave birth to their son Étienne, who was an influential philosopher of aesthetics.

Throughout his career, but more particularly during the first decade of the 20th century, he published his reflections on aesthetics while being a professor at the University of Nancy. Souriau's La Beauté rationnelle (1904) defended aesthetic rationalism.

Throughout his life, Félix Alcan was his main editor.
