= National interest =

Goals and ambitions of a state

National interest refers to a sovereign state's set of objectives and priorities which it seeks to achieve to ensure survival, security, prosperity and influence in the international system. While often framed in terms of power, security and economic well-being, the concept is inherently contested: different theoretical traditions in international relations define national interest differently, and governments may interpret it in ways that reflect domestic political interests or changing social values.

== Etymology ==
The Italian phrase ragione degli stati was first used by Giovanni della Casa around the year 1547.

The expression "reason of state" (ragione di stato) was formulated in 1580, found in the works of Giovanni Botero, who was influenced by, and wrote criticisms of the Italian diplomat and political thinker Niccolò Machiavelli, popularly known as the author of The Prince and the Discourses on Livy. Prominently, Chief Minister Cardinal Richelieu justified France's intervention on the Protestant side, despite its own Catholicism, in the Thirty Years' War (1618–48) as being in the national interest in order to block the increasing power of the Catholic Holy Roman Emperor. At Richelieu's prompting, Jean de Silhon defended the concept of raison d'État as "a mean between what conscience permits and affairs require."

== Usage ==
Within the field of international relations, national interest has frequently been assumed to comprise the pursuit of power, security and wealth. Neorealist and liberal institutionalist scholars tend to define national interest as revolving around security and power. Liberal scholars view national interests as an aggregation of the preferences of domestic political groups. Constructivist scholars reject that the national interest of states are static and can be assumed a priori; rather, they argue that the preferences of states are shaped through social interactions and are changeable.

According to Joesph Nye, the national interest is a "slippery concept", as it both seeks to describe and prescribe foreign policy.

In a February 2020 article for CSIS, Gordon de Brouwer argued: "The national interest has three components—security, prosperity, and social well-being—and they should all be part of framing the problem and solutions. All three matter. More than ever, they reinforce each other. Security underpins prosperity, prosperity creates power and pays for security, and a well-functioning society reduces economic and security risks."

== See also ==
- Common good
- Moral nihilism
- Nation state
- Public opinion
- Public interest
- Realpolitik
- Realism (international relations)
- Self-interest
