= Éric Fiat =

French moral philosopher

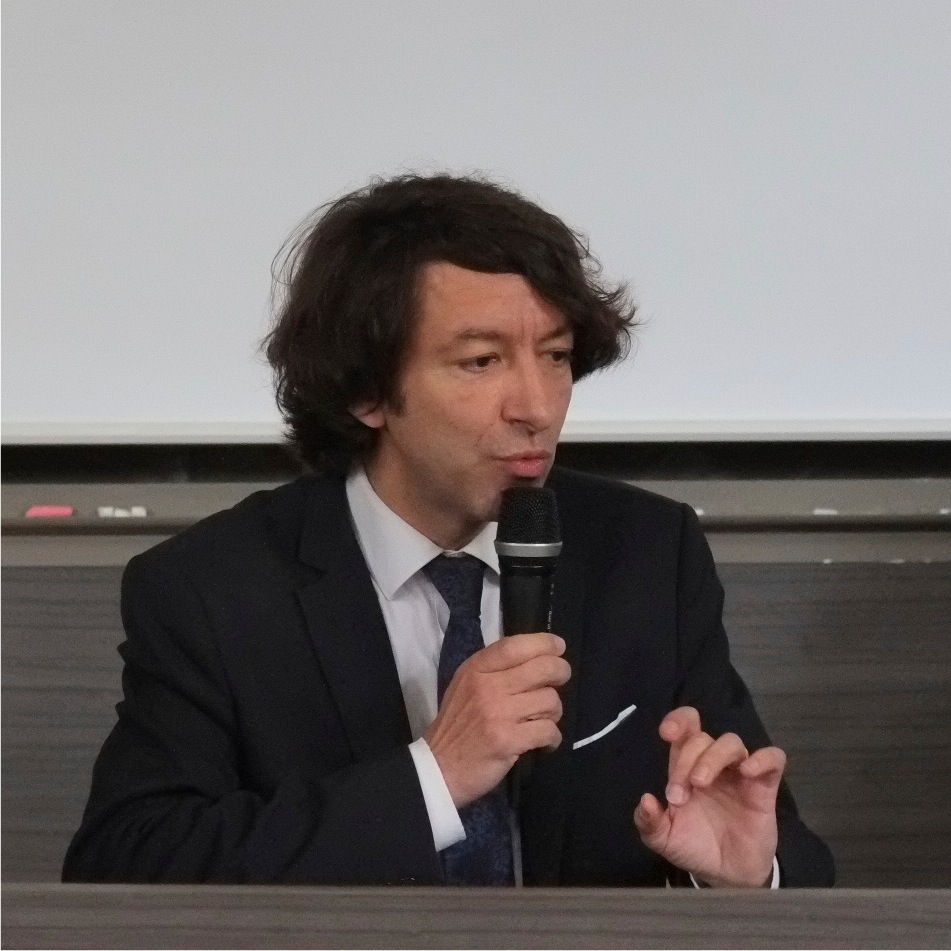
- Born: November 13, 1964 (age 61); Château-Thierry

Education
- Education: Lycée Janson-de-Sailly
- Alma mater: University of Paris-Est Marne-la-Valée (now Gustave Eiffel University)
- Thesis: The forgetfulness of phases (2002)
- Doctoral advisor: Dominique Folscheid

Philosophical work
- Era: Contemporary philosophy
- Region: Western philosophy
- Institutions: Gustave Eiffel University
- Main interests: Moral philosophy, Ethics, Political philosophy, Medical ethics

Éric Fiat (born 13 November 1964, Château-Thierry) is a French philosopher specializing in moral philosophy and ethics. A professor at Gustave Eiffel University, he is also a writer and a cellist.

== Background ==
In 1991, he obtained an Agrégation in Philosophy at Lycée Janson-de-Sailly, Paris. He taught philosophy in high school.

He pursued a doctorate in philosophy at University of Paris-Est Marne-la-Vallée, which later, in 2020, merged with other institutions to form Gustave Eiffel University, with multiple campuses across France.

In 2002, he defended a thesis entitled, L’oubli de la phusis : du recouvrement par la modernité de la conception aristotélicienne de la nature, under the direction of Dominique Folscheid. He then became an associate professor at the university.

He completed a Habilitation to Supervise Research (HDR) under the title La philosophie à l’épreuve du handicap : les chemins de la dignité (Philosophy under the test of disability: the paths of dignity) and became a full professor.

== Career ==
He is the head of the master's program in applied medical and hospital ethics.

He is a permanent member and director (since 2014) of LIPHA - Le Laboratoire Interdisciplinaire d'étude du Politique Hannah Arendt. He had also previously been a director at the Espaces Ethiques et Politiques - Institut Hannah Arendt (EEP) from 2011-2014. Since 2019, he has been a regular speaker at the Mardis de la Philo.

Since 2011, he has been a member of the editorial board for the online journal Éthique, la vie en question and the journal Approches.

He is a member of the ethics committee of the French Society of Hematology and the professional conduct committee of the French National Cancer Institute. He was also previously a member of the Observatoire national de la fin de vie as well as the committee for the Place for the Elderly in the town of the Administration of Paris.

=== Research ===
His work concentrates on human fragility and medical ethics. He offered a philosophical stroll on the art of aging at the Philosophia festival in Saint-Émilion in 2023, a theme on which he spoke in the same year at the festival.

== Other activities ==
Fiat is also a solo cellist of the instrumental ensemble in Château-Thierry.

== Bibliography ==
- Ode à la fatigue, Éditions de l'Observatoire, 2018. ISBN 9791032901687. Alpha, 2022.
- "Un paradis lézardé: une nuit avec Éric Fiat." Philosophie Magazine 2023, no. HS56 (2023): 10-10.
- La pudeur à l’épreuve du soin, Monaco, Les Rencontres Philosophiques de Monaco, 2017.
- La pudeur, with Adèle Van Reeth, Plon, 2016. ISBN 9782259250986.
- "L’accompagnement, comme devoir de civilisation." In Fins de vie, éthique et société, pp. 51–54. Érès, 2016.
- Corps et âme, Ou qu’un peu d’incarnation, ça peut pas faire de mal, Cécile Defaut, 2015. ISBN 9782350183602.
- La couleur du matin profond, interview with Pierre Magnard, Les petits platons, 2013. ISBN 9782361650414.
- "Le soignant et la mort. S’habituer à ce dont il n’y a nulle habitude." In Les soignants et la mort, pp. 181–195. érès, 2013.
- "Face aux métamorphoses, la main qui veille et le cœur endurant." Gérontologie et société 36144, no. 1 (2013): 41-55.
- Petit traité de dignité, Larousse poche, 2012. ISBN 9782035876232.
- Grandeurs et misères des hommes, petit traité de dignité, Larousse, 2010. ISBN 9782035842961.
- Fiat, É., 2008. Les politiques de la vieillesse face aux questions éthiques. Recherche en soins infirmiers, 94(3), pp. 56–62.
- "La négligence est-elle une violence?." Revue d'éthique et de théologie morale 229, no. 2 (2004): 27-33.

=== Co-authored ===
- Le devenir de l’intériorité à l’ère des nouvelles technologies, Le bord de l’eau, coll. « Diagnostics », 2018. ISBN 2356875549.
- Handicap, Handicaps, Parole et silence, Lethielleux, 2013. ISBN 9782249622649.
- Questions d’amour, De l’amour dans la relation soignante, Parole et silence, Lethielleux, 2008.ISBN 9782283610541.
