= Fabienne Brugère =

French philosopher (born 1964)

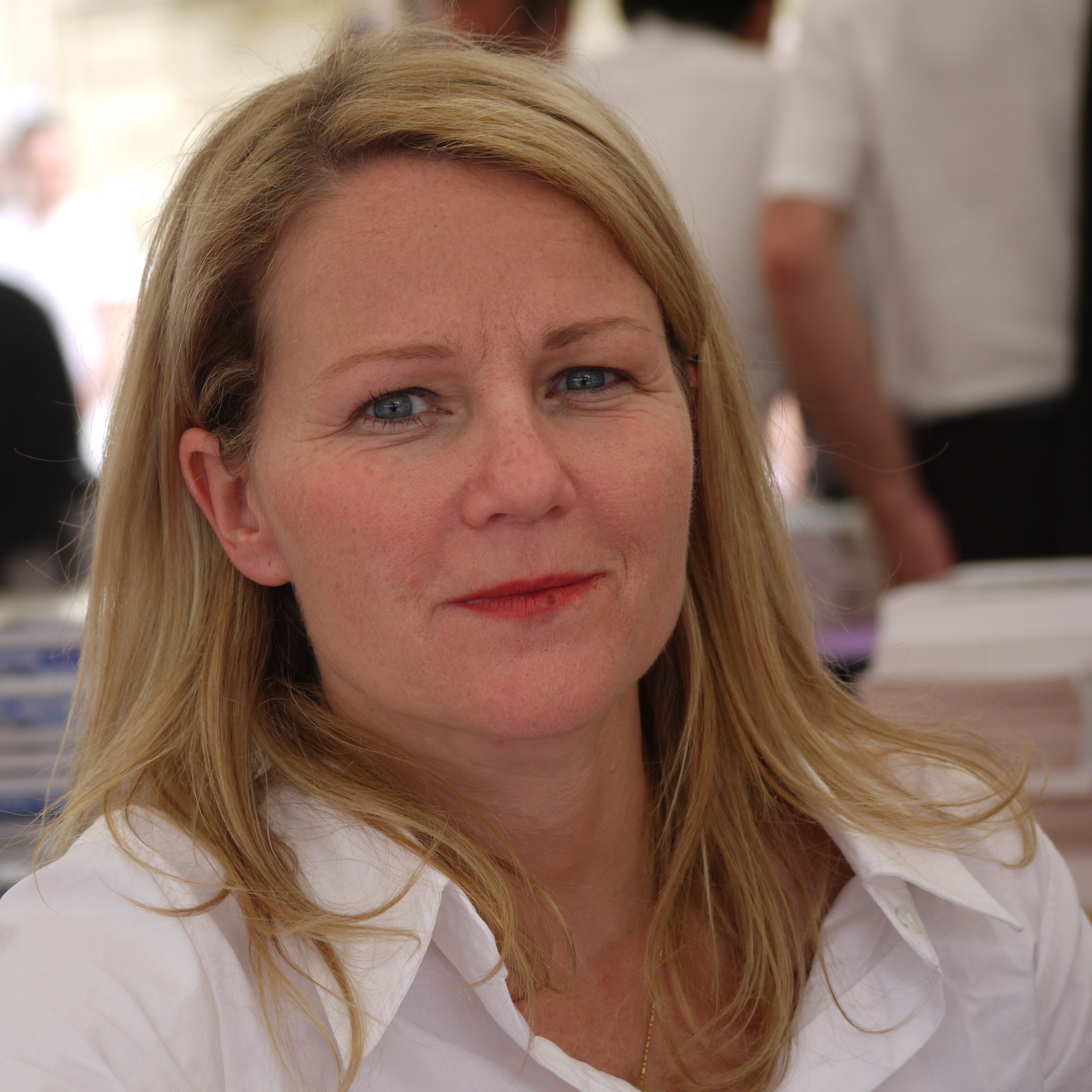
- Fabienne Brugère in 2009
- Born: 1964 (age 61–62); Nevers, France
- Occupation: Philosopher
- Known for: Aesthetics; moral and political philosophy; feminist theory
- Awards: Knight, Legion of Honour (2015)

Education
- Education: École normale supérieure de Fontenay-Saint-Cloud; Paris Nanterre University

Philosophical work
- Institutions: Bordeaux Montaigne University; Paris 8 University Vincennes-Saint-Denis
- Notable works: La fin de l'hospitalité; On ne naît pas femme, on le devient

Fabienne Brugère (born in 1964, Nevers) is a French philosopher specializing in aesthetics and philosophy of art, history of modern philosophy (18th century), moral and political philosophy, Anglo-American philosophy studies and feminist theory. She was a professor at the Bordeaux Montaigne University and vice-president for international relations at this university. She joined the Paris 8 University Vincennes-Saint-Denis since September 2014, as chair of "philosophy of modern and contemporary arts". She has been president of the Paris Lumières University Group since November 2019, after having chaired the academic council of this institution.

== Education ==
Brugère was admitted to the École normale supérieure de Fontenay-Saint-Cloud in 1987. She obtained the agrégation in philosophy in 1991 after a year spent at the Imperial College London (Department of Humanities). In 1996, she defended her thesis entitled Théorie de l’art et philosophie de la sociabilité selon Shaftesbury (Theory of Art and Philosophy of Sociability according to Shaftesbury), at Paris Nanterre University with Geneviève Brykman, her thesis director, Didier Deleule, Jean-Paul Larthomas, Michel Malherbe, and Pierre-François Moreau.

== Career ==
She taught philosophy as a lecturer at the University of Paris X-Nanterre (1992–1995), as a Attaché Temporaire d'Enseignement et de Recherche (ATER) at the University of Western Brittany and University of Nantes (1995–1997), and as a lecturer at the University of Toulouse-Jean Jaurès. She was elected professor at the Bordeaux Montaigne University with a title "Philosophy of English language" after a habilitation to direct research defended at Paris Nanterre University in November 2003 on the theme "Empiricism and its aesthetic operations". She left Bordeaux for the Paris 8 University Vincennes-Saint-Denis in September 2014.

Brugère is a visiting professor at the University of Hamburg, University of Québec, and LMU Munich.

She was president of the Sustainable Development Council of Bordeaux between June 2008 and June 2013. In 2014, she was on the list of the socialist candidate Vincent Feltesse for the municipal elections in Bordeaux. She is also the co-president of "Périféeries 2028", which seeks to make Saint-Denis, Plaine Commune, and Seine-Saint-Denis the European Capital of Culture, 2028.

She directs the collections "Lignes d'art" and "Care studies" at Presses Universitaires de France (PUF), Paris and "Diagnostics" at Editions du Bord de l'eau, Bordeaux/Lormont.

== Awards and honours ==
- Knight, Legion of Honour, April 2015

== Selected works ==
=== Books ===
- Théorie de l'art et philosophie de la sociabilité selon Shaftesbury, éditions Honoré Champion, coll. « Les Dix-huitièmes siècles », 1999
- Le goût : art, passions et société, PUF, coll. « philosophies », 2000
- L'expérience de la beauté, Vrin, 2006
- C’est trop beau, Giboulées Gallimard Jeunesse, March 2008, translated into Korean and Spanish
- Questions de respect : Enquête sur les figures contemporaines du respect with Maryvonne Charmillot and Raphaël Gély, Université de Bruxelles, coll. « Philosophie et société » ISBN 2800414111, 978-2800414119
- Le sexe de la sollicitude, octobre 2008, éditions du Seuil (republished by Le Bord de l'eau), 2013
- Philosophie de l'art with Julia Peker, September 2010, Presses Universitaires de France - PUF, coll. «Licence Philo» ISBN 2130570216, 978-2130570219
- L'éthique du « care », Presses Universitaires de France - PUF, coll. « Que sais-je? », February 2011, reissued twice, ISBN 2130586333, 978-2130586333
- Le nouvel esprit du libéralisme with Guillaume le Blanc, éditions Le Bord de l'eau, coll. « Diagnostics », November 2011, ISBN 2356870474, 978-2356870476
- Faut-il se révolter, Bayard Jeunesse, coll. « Le temps d'une question », March 2012 ISBN 2227483539, 978-2227483538
- Dictionnaire politique à l'usage des gouvernés with and under the direction of Guillaume le Blanc, Groupe Bayard, Bayard Jeunesse, coll. « Essais », March 2012 ISBN 2227482699, 978-2227482692.
- La politique de l'individu, La République des Idées/Seuil, 2013
- La fin de l'hospitalité, with Guillaume le Blanc, Flammarion, 2017
- On ne naît pas femme, on le devient, Stock, 2019 ISBN 9782234086210
