= Philippe Nys =

Belgian-born French philosopher (born 1947)

Philippe Nys (born 1947, Tournai) is a Belgian-born French philosopher. The focus of his work is hermeneutics, poetics and theory of space's design. He is associated professor (maître de conférences) at the University of Paris8 (UFR ARTS, department of Fine Arts), member of the research teams EA 4010 Arts des images et Art contemporain/Arts of Images and Contemporary Art, AMP: Architecture Milieu Paysage/ Architecture Milieu Landscape at the National School of Architecture of Paris La Villette. He is lecturer in several schools of architecture and landscape such as Paris-Belleville, Versailles, Lille.

== Life and career ==
Philippe Nys in 1970 obtains his agrégation in Philosophy and Literature and his B.A. in Philosophy and Literature with a specialisation in Roman Philology and a thesis on Georges Bataille’s Novels at the Free University of Brussels. In 1973 he obtains his B.A. in Philosophy with the thesis Remarks on ‘What is Metaphysics ?’ of Martin Heidegger. In 1995 he obtains his Ph.D. in Philosophy and Literature with a specialisation in philosophy with a thesis on Elements for Hermeneutics and Phenomenology of Dwelling Places : Garden – Architecture – Landscape. In 1998 and 2002 he receives the qualification from the National Council of French Universities in aesthetics.
