= Albert Caraco =

French-Uruguayan philosopher

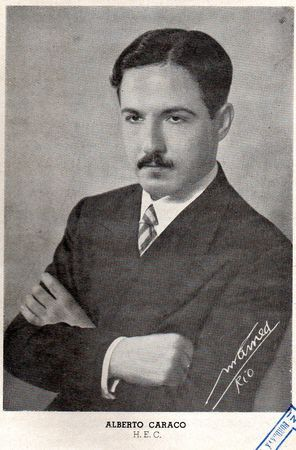
- Caraco in 1941
- Born: 8 July 1919; Istanbul, Ottoman Empire
- Died: 7 September 1971 (aged 52); Paris, France
- Citizenship: French, Uruguayan

Philosophical work
- Era: 20th-century philosophy
- Region: Western philosophy
- School: Continental philosophy, Philosophical pessimism, existentialism
- Main interests: Nihilism, ethics, politics, art, aesthetics, religion, literature

Albert Caraco (8 July 1919 – 7 September 1971) was a French-Uruguayan philosopher, writer, essayist and poet of Turkish Jewish descent. He is known for his two major works, Post Mortem (1968) and posthumously published Bréviaire du chaos (1982). He is often compared to the philosophers and writers such as Emil Cioran, Louis-Ferdinand Céline, Nicolás Gómez Dávila and Friedrich Nietzsche.

== Biography ==
Albert Caraco was born in Istanbul on 8 July 1919 to a Jewish family. His family relocated in Vienna, Prague and later in Berlin, before settling in Paris. He attended the Lycée Janson de Sailly and graduated from Ecole des Hautes Etudes Commerciales in 1939. At the same year, Caraco and his family fled to South America due to Nazi threat and approaching World War II. His family received Uruguayan citizenship and converted to Catholicism. In the early 1940s, Caraco published a series of poems and plays.

In 1946, Caraco returned to Paris, where he spent the rest of his life. Inspired by monastic discipline, he devoted himself to writing, although he renounced his Catholic faith. His mother's death in 1969, which was widely documented in his work, Post mortem, had a negative effect on his state. On 7 September 1971, following his father's death, he committed suicide. Most of his unreleased works were posthumously published by L'Age d'Homme publishing company.

An article regarding Caraco's works and life, written by Louis Nucéra, was published on 4 May 1984 in Le Monde.

== Selected works ==
- Le livre des combats de l'âme (1949)
- L'école des intransigeants. Rébellion pour l'ordre (1952)
- Le désirable et le sublime. Phénoménologie de l'Apocalypse (1953)
- Foi, valeur et besoin, Paris 1957;
- Apologie d'Israël, vol. 1: Plaidoyer pour les indéfendables (1957)
- Apologie d'Israël, vol. 2: La marche à travers les ruines (1957)
- Huit essais sur le mal (1963, 1979)
- Le tombeau de l'histoire (1966, 1976)
- Les races et les classes (1967)
- Post mortem (1968); English translation by R. P. A. Delpeuch, KDP (2025) ISBN 9798271742040
- La luxure et la mort: relations de l'ordre et de la sexualité (1968)
- L'ordre et le sexe (1970)
- Obéissance ou servitude? (1974)
- Ma confession, Lausanne (1975)
- L'homme de lettres: un art d'écrire (1975)
- Bréviaire du chaos (1982)
- Supplément à la "Psychopathia sexualis" (1983)
- Ecrits sur la religion (1984)
- Post mortem (1984)
- Semainier de l'incertitude (1994)
- La luxure et la mort (2000)
- Mystère d'Israël (2004).
