= Gregg Schlanger =

American art professor

Gregg Schlanger is a Professor of Art and Chair of the Department of Art at Central Washington University in Ellensburg, Washington. He received his BFA from Boise State University in 1987 and his MFA from Northern Illinois University in 1989. Formerly an art professor at Austin Peay State University, he moved to Central Washington University as chair in 2011. He works in installation art, often with an environmental theme.

== Exhibits ==
Schlanger's exhibits include:

- "Waterway for the Black Rock", an Escher-like hand-pumped system of waterways exhibited at Burning Man in 1992 and archived by the Center for Art + Environment at the Nevada Museum of Art.
- "Sockeye Waters, Sockeye Dreams", painted wooden fish exhibited in 1998 at Redfish Lake, Idaho, and later at the Idaho Salmon Days festival in Boise, Idaho, supported by the New York Foundation for the Arts, to bring attention to the decline of native salmon in Redfish Lake. Schlanger originally intended to make the fish from aluminum, but changed to wood after learning that the aluminum industry was a contributor to local environmental problems.
- "Smith Hill Visions, Concrete Dreams", concrete casts of endangered animals, commissioned for a public exhibit in 2002 in the low-income urban neighborhood of Smith Hill, Providence, Rhode Island.
- "Pillar of Cloud, Pillar of Fire", a 30 feet (9.1 m) tall steel pillar commemorating soldiers in all wars installed in 2004 in Clarksville, Tennessee.
- A collection of digital prints concerning the Cumberland River basin, exhibited at Nashville International Airport in 2004 and funded by the Tennessee Arts Commission.
- "Water", a 2009 installation in Charlotte, North Carolina, consisting of 48 glass bottles representing the amount of water used per person per day in different countries.
- "Mapping Paradise", a 2013 collaborative show at McMaster University in Canada, where Schlanger was a visiting scholar, coordinated by Schlanger and McMaster professor Judy Major-Girardin. The art concerned the ecological remediation of the Cootes Paradise wetland and Niagara Escarpment, and featured a piece by Schlanger, an installation portraying a McMaster parking lot as an offshore oil drilling platform, as its "central defining artwork".
- "Pu-239: Plutonium Button", part of the "Facing Rocky Flats" group show in 2018 at the Boulder Public Library concerning the history of the Rocky Flats Plant for nuclear weapons.
