= Jean Clam =

Philosopher, sociologist and psychologist

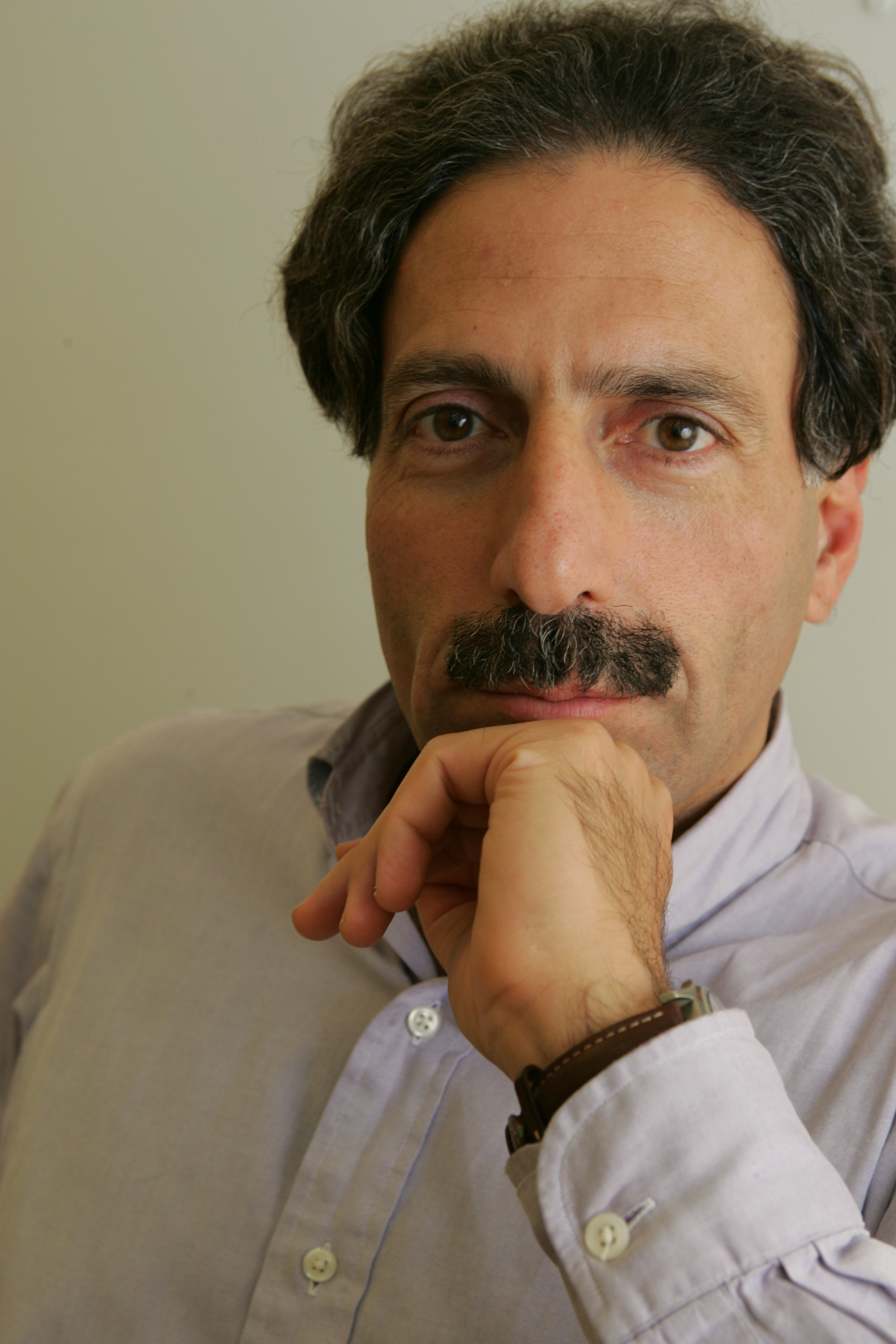
Portrait Jean Clam

Jean Clam (born 1958) is a philosopher, sociologist and psychologist. He is Research Fellow at the Centre national de la recherche scientifique (CNRS), Paris, presently affiliated to the Ecole des Hautes Etudes en Sciences Sociales (EHESS) in Paris. His numerous researches deal mainly with sociology and psychology of intimacy, legal theory (in particular that of Niklas Luhmann) and general theory of the human and social sciences.

== Books ==
- Sache und Logik der Phänomenologie Husserls und Heideggers, Beitrag zur Klärung der Idee von Phänomenologie, Altenberge, Akademische Bibliothek 1985.
- Droit et société chez Niklas Luhmann. La contingence des normes, (avec un Avant-propos de Niklas Luhmann), Paris, Presses Universitaires de France 1997[1].
- Norme, fait, fluctuation: Contributions à une analyse des choix normatifs, Genève, (Avec Jean-Luc Gaffard), Droz 2001.
- Was heißt: Sich an Differenz statt an Identität orientieren? Zur De-ontologisierung in Philosophie und Sozialwissenschaft, Konstanz, UVK (Universitätsverlag Konstanz) 2002.
- Trajectoires de l'immatériel. Contributions à une théorie de la valeur et de sa dématérialisation, Paris, CNRS Editions 2004.
- Kontingenz, Paradox, Nur-Vollzug. Grundprobleme einer Theorie der Gesellschaft, Konstanz, UVK (Universitätsverlag Konstanz) 2004[2].
- Sciences du sens. Perspectives théoriques, Strasbourg, Presses Universitaires de Strasbourg 2006.
- L'intime. Genèse, régimes, nouages : contributions à une sociologie et une psychologie de l'intimité contemporaine, Paris, Ganse Arts et Lettres 2007.
- Aperceptions du présent. Théorie d'un aujourd'hui par-delà la détresse, Paris, Ganse Arts et Lettres 2010.
- Die Gegenwart des Sexuellen: Analytik ihrer Härte, Berlin, Turia + Kant, Verlag, 2011
- Orexis, désir, poursuite : Une théorie de la désirance Volume 1, L'animation du corps, Paris, Ganse Arts et Lettres 2012.
- Genèses du corps : des corps premiers aux corps contemporains, Paris, Ganse Arts et Lettres 2014.
- Le corps sans garde: innocence, oraison, délire, Paris, Ganse Arts et Lettres 2017.
- Soit ! Dé-soit ! Un encolonnement, Paris, Ganse Arts et Lettres 2018.
- Souffles, Paris, Ganse Arts et Lettres 2018.
- Globalités paradoxales et ipséités différentielles sans dehors. Constructions du sens social et culturel du présent, Paris, Ganse Arts et Lettres 2019.
- Explorations psychanalytiques de ce qui résiste et de ce qui cède. Autour des vicissitudes de la culture et de la pulsion, Paris, Ganse Arts et Lettres 2022.
- La violence et son suspend. Médiations contemporaines du droit, du pouvoir et de la croyance, Paris, Ganse Arts et Lettres 2023.
- Sion sera ou une fête ou ne sera pas. Une réflexion sur la guerre de Gaza, les origines d’Israël et les enchaînements de la souffrance, Paris, Ganse Arts et Lettres 2024
