= Alexis Rosenbaum =

French essayist

Alexis Rosenbaum (born 1969, in Paris) is a French essayist. After studying philosophy and psychology at the University of Paris-Sorbonne, he graduated with a dissertation on "hierarchical representations in the history of philosophy". He currently teaches at the Polytechnic Institute of Paris.

Most of Rosenbaum's multidisciplinary works are meant to put modes of comparison into historical perspective. The sacred order (L'ordre sacré) questions the importance of hierarchical images (levels of thought, strata of Being, scales of virtue,...) in the history of western philosophy. Stressing the importance of platonic traditions, Rosenbaum argues that stratification is the prevailing mode of comparison in antique and medieval philosophy. He acknowledges the decline of hierarchical images during the European Renaissance, but contends that this decline is misleading, as hierarchical representations have been surviving in more discreet ways ever since. The fear of inferiority (La peur de l'infériorité) investigates the historical changes in procedures of social comparison, highlighting the peculiarities of the contemporary system of "overcomparison". The influence of Alfred Adler's thought on this work is undeniable. Through the expectation of personal success, the intensification of envy and the invasion of measures, it is argued, subjects of nonhierarchical societies are constantly comparing to each other and "prone to feelings of inferiority". In Antisemitism, Rosenbaum tries to show how this permanent and ubiquitous social jealousy frames the modern forms of antisemitism. In Vivid memories, lastly, the question of the collective components of pride or humiliation is tackled. Drawing on social comparison theory, Rosenbaum maintains that History of one's group is a major resource for individuals seeking to gain or regain self-esteem. The emergence of competing memories in multicultural countries like France or the U.S. is then traced back to social comparison processes.

== Selected works ==
- 2007: Vivid memories. [Mémoires vives. Comment les communautés instrumentalisent l'Histoire]. Paris: Bourin.
- 2006: Antisemitism. [L'antisémitisme]. Paris: Bréal
- 2005: The fear of inferiority [La peur de l'infériorité. Aperçus sur le régime moderne de la comparaison sociale]. Paris: L'Harmattan.
- 2003: Imaginary gazes. [Regards imaginaires. Essais préliminaires à une écologie visuelle.] Paris: L'Harmattan
- 1999: The sacred order. [L'ordre sacré. Les représentations hiérarchiques en philosophie.] Paris : Desclée de Brouwer.
