= Jean de Silhon =

French philosopher (1596–1667)

Jean de Silhon (1596, Sos, Agenais – February 1667, Paris) was a French philosopher and politician. He was a founding member, and the first to occupy seat 24 of the Académie française in 1634.

At Cardinal Richelieu's prompting, he defended the concept of reason of state, arguing that the political necessities under which the State operates mean that it need not always follow normal laws of ethics, such as telling the truth. Reason of state was thus, he said, "a mean between that which conscience permits and affairs require."
