= Lionel Dauriac =

French philosopher and musicologist

Lionel Dauriac (19 November 1847 – 26 May 1923) was a French philosopher and musicologist.

Dauriac was born in Brest, the son of an admiral. He was a professor of musical aesthetics at the Sorbonne between 1896 and 1903. He died on 26 May 1923 in Paris. An internationally minded music critic, he wrote biographies of Gioachino Rossini, Richard Wagner and Giacomo Meyerbeer.

== Biography ==
Lionel Alexandre Dauriac studied at the École Normale Supérieure. He was awarded the Agrégation in Philosophy in 1872. He defended a doctoral thesis at the Faculté des Lettres de Paris on Les Notions de matière et de force dans les sciences de la nature (1878) and a Latin thesis on Heraclitus. He taught at the Lycée de Brest, France, the Faculté de Lyon in 1879, and the Faculté de Toulouse in 1881, before succeeding Désiré Nolen as Professor of Philosophy at the University of Montpellier in 1882. Between 1883 and 1888, he published several essays in Charles Renouvier journal Critique philosophique, which, along with other elements of his teaching, were included in the book Croyance et Réalité (1889) dedicated to this philosopher. In 1890, he offered a course in the philosophy of music at Montpellier - an innovation in the teaching system of the time - focusing on the psychology of the musician. The course was published by Alcan in 1891 and gave rise to numerous lectures. Lionel Dauriac developed this teaching at the University of Paris from 1895 onwards. He also published his course on the evolution of music and musical taste in France in 1897 under the title Psychologie dans l'opéra français (Auber-Rossini-Meyerbeer). He dedicated the work to Charles Lévêque, whom he recognized as the initiator of music psychology studies in France. In 1895, he traveled to Germany to study the state of musical aesthetics in German universities. He then moved to Paris with the intention of being appointed professor at the Sorbonne (building). But he failed to win the chair of psychology and musical aesthetics at the Sorbonne he had been hoping for, despite the support of Paul Janet,Émile Boutroux and Théodule-Armand Ribot (the first chair of aesthetics was created in France in 1921). In 1897, he taught at the Lycée Lakanal, then at the Lycée Janson-de-Sailly. He then retired prematurely, becoming curator of the Victor-Cousin library at the Sorbonne (where his own papers are now kept). He published several works on musical psychology, on the composers Gioachino Rossini (1904),Richard Wagner (1908) and Giacomo Meyerbeer (1913), and on philosophical Rationalism.

He was a member of the Montpellier Academy of Science and Letters from 1885 to 1889.

== Works ==
- Des notions de matière et de force dans les sciences de la nature, 1878.
- Croyance et realité, 1889.
- Rossini: biographie critique, 1902.
- Essai sur l'esprit musical, 1904.
- Meyerbeer, 1913.
- Contingence et rationalisme; pages d'histoire et de doctrine, 1924.
