= Dominique Bourg =

French philosopher and ecologist (born 1953)

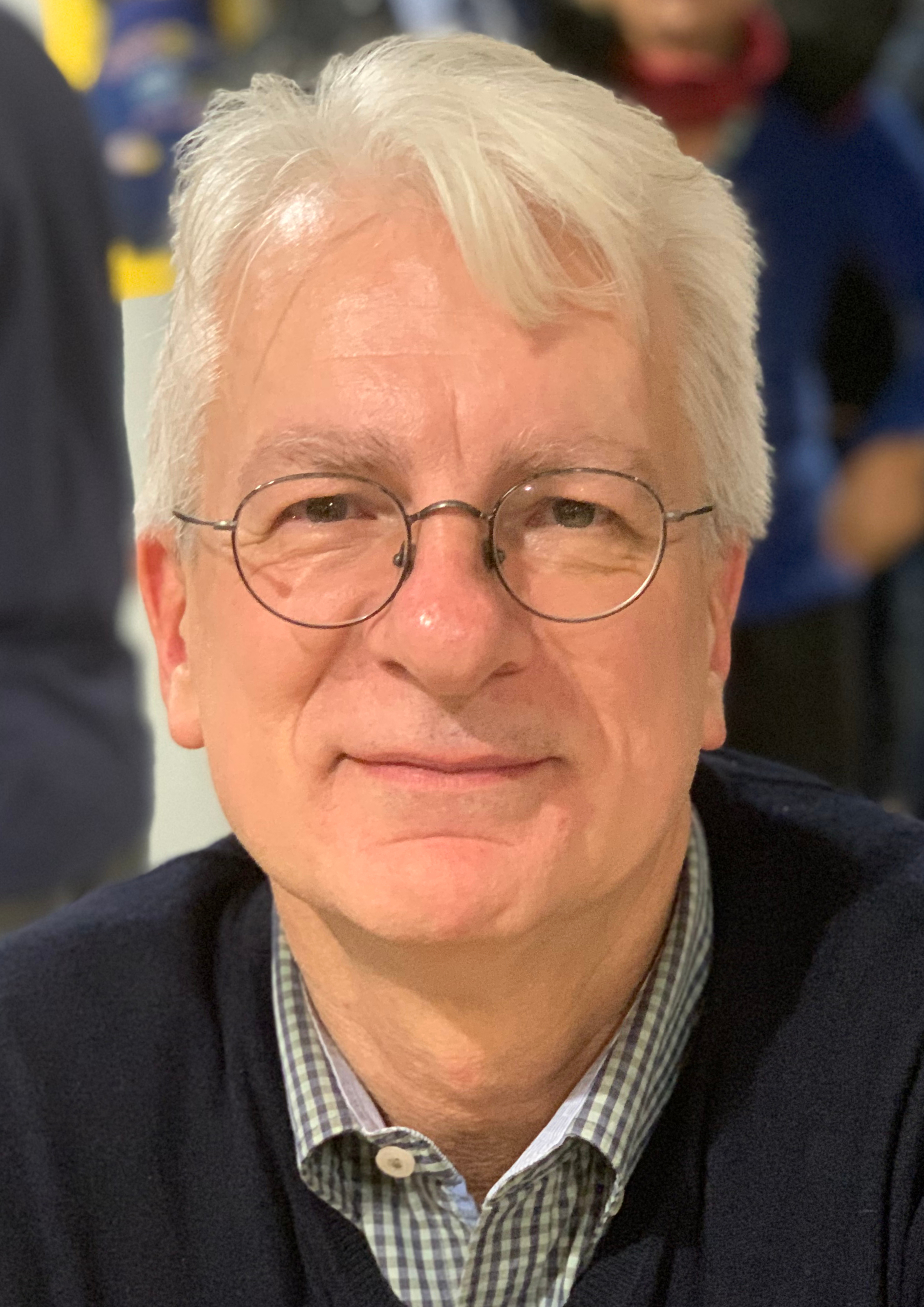
- Dominique Bourg, in 2019
- Occupations: Researcher, professor
- Title: Professor
- Children: Three
- Awards: Officer of the Legion of Honour; Officer of the National Order of Merit

Academic background
- Education: Marc Bloch University; School for Advanced Studies in the Social Sciences
- Thesis: (1981 and 1995)

Academic work
- Discipline: Philosophy, environmental science, ecology
- Institutions: Paris Institute of Political Studies; University of Technology of Troyes; University of Lausanne (since 2006)
- Main interests: Sustainable development, degrowth, environmentalism
- Website: http://igd.unil.ch/dominiquebourg

Dominique Bourg (born 11 August 1953 in Tavaux; French pronunciation: [buʁ]) is a French philosopher. Since 2006, he is professor at the Faculty of Geosciences and Environment of the University of Lausanne (Switzerland).

He has two doctorates and is a specialist of the environment, global changes, and sustainable development. He published many articles and books and participated in various committees related to the environment.

== Works ==
Dominique Bourg co-directed La pensée écologique. Une anthologie (literally "Ecological Thinking: an Anthology") with Antoine Fragnière (2014) and the Dictionnaire de la pensée écologique ("Dictionary of Ecological Thinking") with Alain Papaux (2015). He analyses that, "Ecological thinking is characterised by a critique of modernity, a scepticism about the possibility of solving environmental problems through technology and a questioning of the separation between humans and nature".

According to Bourg, the root of the global problem (the deterioration of the environment) is the flow of materials and energy (linked with consumerism). He also thinks that over the last decades, economic growth increased wealth concentration and economic inequality while accelerating the destruction of natural resources and ecosystems, but without fulfilling its promise to provide more jobs or make people happier.

== Honours ==
- Prix du « Promeneur solitaire » in 2003.
- Officer of the National Order of Merit since 2004.
- Officer of the Legion of Honour since 2013 (Knight since 2001).
- « Prix du livre environnement » of the Veolia Foundation in 2015, for the Dictionnaire de la pensée écologique ("Dictionary of Ecological Thinking").

== Other ==
Dominique Bourg was part of the "Coppens commission" who prepared the French Charter for the Environment of 2004.

== See also ==
- List of French philosophers
