= Albert Spaier =

French philosopher

Albert Spaier (9 July 1883 – 5 February 1934) was a French philosopher, professor of philosophy at the University of Caen.

Albert Spaier was born in Iași, Romania. Studying at the Sorbonne, he volunteered to fight for the French at the outset of World War I, and became a French citizen soon afterwards. He became a professor at Caen in 1927.

Spaier helped found the Recherches philosophiques, editing its philosophy of science section until his death. He died prematurely on 5 February 1934.

== Works ==
- La pensée et la quantité; essai sur la signification et la réalité des grandeurs, 1927
- La pensée concrète; essai sur le symbolisme intellectuel, 1931
- La Nature et les éléments psychiques de l'habitude, 1935
