= Jean-Félix Nourrisson =

Jean-Felix Nourrisson (18 July 1825 – 13 June 1899) was a nineteenth-century French Catholic philosopher.

== Publications ==
- Essai sur la philosophie de Bossuet (1852)
- Le Cardinal de Bérulle, sa vie, ses écrits, son temps (1856)
- Les Pères de l'Église latine, leur vie, leurs écrits, leur temps (2 volumes, 1856)
- Exposition de la théorie platonicienne des idées (1858)
- Tableau des progrès de la pensée humaine depuis Thalès jusqu'à Leibniz (1858)
- Histoire et philosophie, portraits et études (1863)
- La Philosophie de Leibniz (1860)
- Le XVIII^{e} siècle et la Révolution française (1863)
- La Philosophie de saint Augustin (1865)
- La Nature humaine, essais de psychologie appliquée (1865)
- Spinoza et le Naturalisme contemporain (1866)
- La Politique de Bossuet (1867)
- De la liberté et du hasard, essai sur Alexandre d'Aphrodisias (1870)
- Machiavel (1874)
- Pascal physicien et philosophe (1885)
- Trois révolutionnaires : Turgot, Necker, Bailly (1885)
- Philosophie de la nature, Bacon, Beyle, Toland, Buffon (1887)
- Voltaire et le voltairianisme (1896)
- Rousseau et le rousseauisme (1904)
