= Cécile Laborde =

Political theorist

Cécile Laborde FBA is a professor of political theory at the University of Oxford. Since 2017, she has held the Nuffield Chair of Political Theory and in 2013 she was elected a Fellow of the British Academy. Her research focusses on republicanism, liberalism and religion, theories of law and the state, and global justice. Her most recent book, Liberalism's Religion, was published by Harvard University Press in 2017.

== Biography ==
Laborde was born in France. From 1989 to 1992, she studied at Sciences Po Bordeaux. She graduated with a degree in political science. She then moved to England to study European politics at the University of Hull, graduating with an MA in 1993, before studying at the University of Oxford as a Rhodes scholar, where she obtained a DPhil in politics in 1997. She was a member of St. Antony's College. The title of her DPhil thesis was "States, Groups, and Individuals. Pluralism in British and French Political Thought".

She has held positions at University of Exeter, King's College London, and University College London (UCL), including as Professor of Political Theory in the School of Public Policy at UCL from 2009 to 2017. From 2010 to 2011, she was a fellow at the Institute of Advanced Study at Princeton. From 2012 to 2016, she was the principal investigator of a European Research Council (ERC) project entitled "Is religion special? Secularism and religion in contemporary legal and political theory". Since 2017, she has held the Nuffield Chair in Political Theory at the University of Oxford.

== Honours, awards and distinctions ==
Laborde was elected a Fellow of the British Academy in 2013.

== Published books ==
- Laborde, Cécile (1995). La Confrérie Layenne et les Lébou du Sénégal (in French). Institut d'études politiques de Bordeaux. ISBN 9782908065305.
- —— (2000). Pluralist Thought and the State in Britain and France, 1900-25. Macmillan. ISBN 9780333732021.
- —— (2008). Critical Republicanism: The Hijab Conspiracy and Political Philosophy. Oxford University Press. ISBN 9780199550210.
- Laborde, Cécile; Maynor, John, eds. (2008). Republicanism and Political Theory. John Wiley & Sons. ISBN 9781405155793.
- —— (2010). Français, encore un effort pour être républicains! (in French). Le Seuil. ISBN 9782021018714.
- Cohen, Jean L.; Laborde, Cécile, eds. (2015). Religion, Secularism, and Constitutional Democracy. Columbia University Press. ISBN 9780231540735.
- —— (2017). Liberalism's Religion. Harvard University Press. ISBN 978-0674976269.
