= Jean Soldini =

Swiss philosopher

Jean Soldini (born 13 March 1956 in Lugano) is a Swiss and French philosopher, art historian and poet.

== Biography ==
He studied in Paris, where he earned the Habilitation à diriger des recherches (1995), after he graduated with a Ph.D. in philosophy and with a preceding Ph.D. in history of architecture.

== Knowledge and hospitality ==
His studies are aimed to build a non-authoritarian metaphysics where aesthetics of hospitality plays a primary role within knowledge, looking for the possibility of a resistance against the annihilation of the Other. A resistance against the arrogance of any kind of authoritarian thinking with its multiform camouflages, with its never-ending threat against what is existing-with-other. The aesthetics of hospitality should not be confused with the aestheticization of hospitality. It is a philosophical approach concerned with reflecting on sensation through what has its focus on the senses: to donate and receive food, water, a roof for sleeping. Soldini is also author of essays on Alberto Giacometti, exploring the philosophical margins of a creative work that put into effect the vital desire for radical understanding.

== Bibliography ==
- Monico. L'opera incisa, preface by Vittorio Fagone, Bellinzona, Casagrande,1987.
- La Pinacoteca Züst, Bellinzona, Casagrande, 1988.
- Affreschi tardoromanici nel Battistero di Riva San Vitale, Bellinzona, Casagrande, 1990.
- Alberto Giacometti. Le colossal, la mère, le “sacré”, Lausanne, L'Age d'Homme, 1993.
- Saggio sulla discesa della bellezza. Linee per un'estetica, Milan, Jaca Book, 1995.
- Alberto Giacometti. La somiglianza introvabile, preface by René Schérer, Milan, Jaca Book, 1998.
- Cose che sporgono, “alla chiara fonte”, Lugano, 2004 (Book of the year 2005 of Swiss Schiller Foundation).
- Il riposo dell'amato. Una metafisica per l'uomo nell'epoca del mercato come fine unico, Milan, Jaca Book, 2005.
- "Storia, memoria, arte sacra tra passato e futuro", Sacre Arti, edited by F. Gualdoni, texts by T. Tzara, S. Yanagi, T. Burckhardt, 2008.
- “Resistance and Beauty of the Other”, FMR White Edition, Milan, 2008, n.4, pp. 96–109.
- Bivacchi, Ulivo, Balerna 2009.
- Resistenza e ospitalità, Milan, Jaca Book, 2010.
- A testa in giù. Per un'ontologia della vita in comune, preface by René Schérer, Milan, Mimesis, 2012.
- Tenere il passo, preface by Jean-Charles Vegliante, Edizioni Lietocolle, Faloppio (Como) 2014.
- Alberto Giacometti. L'espace et la force, Éditions Kimé, Paris, 2016.
- Graphics on the Border between Art and Thought / Alberto Giacometti. Grafica al confine fra arte e pensiero, edited by Jean Soldini and Nicoletta Ossanna Cavadini, Skira, Milan 2020.
- Schiave e minatori. Versi per una scena, Museo Vela, Ligornetto 2021.
- Il cuore dell'essere, la grazia delle attrazioni. Tentativi di postantropocentrismo, preface by Roberto Diodato, Milan, Mimesis, 2022.
- Quaderno a righe. Poesie 2014-2022, preface by Angelo Maugeri, Forlimpopoli, L'Arcolaio, 2023.
- Prima del cielo e del mare, preface by Alberto Fraccacreta, Latiano, Interno Libri Edizioni, 2026.
- La “follia” del comune, la passione del reale. Ripensare la materialità e la democrazia contro il nichilismo, preface by Claudia Baracchi, Pistoia, Editrice Petite Plaisance, 2026.
- La persistenza di un cosmo minore, in Anna Beltrametti, Pasolini, Petrolio. I classici non sono più una risorsa per raccontare la contemporaneità. Ricerca (e fallimento) di una narrazione totale, Pistoia, Editrice Petite Plaisance, 2026, pp. 5-54.
