= Isabelle Aubert =

Canadian neuroscientist

Isabelle Aubert is a Canadian neuroscientist with expertise in developing regenerative therapies for neurodegenerative disorders (including Alzheimer's disease). She is a senior scientist at Sunnybrook Research Institute (where she leads Sunnybrook's Brain Repair Group), and is a professor in laboratory medicine and pathobiology at the University of Toronto. In 2019, Aubert was appointed as a Canada Research Chair (Tier 1) in Brain Repair and Regeneration.

== Research ==
Aubert's research involves developing treatments to protect and repair the brain after illness or injury, including a novel gene therapy to reprogram brain cells, and using low-intensity focused ultrasound guided by MRI to bypass the blood-brain barrier and deliver therapeutics to specific areas of the brain. The latter is a minimally invasive technique, where using MRI to visualize target areas in the brain, microbubbles are injected into the bloodstream. Focused ultrasound is then used to make the microbubbles vibrate, temporarily opening the blood-brain barrier for a few hours. During this time period, therapeutics can be injected into the bloodstream, which will reach the targeted areas in the brain. Aubert is using this technique to develop regenerative therapies for neurodegenerative disorders.

Research from Aubert's lab has demonstrated that using focused ultrasound to deliver antibodies into the brains of mice with Alzheimer's disease results in a reduction of amyloid-beta plaques (a hallmark characteristic of Alzheimer's), and that it is possible to safely open the blood-brain barrier using focused ultrasound in people with amyotrophic lateral sclerosis (ALS). Aubert's lab has also demonstrated that MRI-guided focused ultrasound can be used to deliver the D3 molecule (a growth factor-related therapeutic) to cholinergic neurons (memory-related brain cells, which are vulnerable in Alzheimer's disease) into the brains of mice with Alzheimer's disease.

Aubert has published over 150 academic publications, which have been cited over 6,000 times, resulting in an h-index and i10-index of 36 and 63 respectively. In 2019, Aubert received a $100,000 one-year grant from the Canadian Institutes of Health Research to "explore the use of genetic engineering of brain cells so that they can make antibodies against the toxic proteins related to the pathology of Alzheimer's disease."

== Selected academic publications ==
- Ultrasound delivery of a TrkA agonist confers neuroprotection to Alzheimer-associated pathologies. Kristiana Xhima, Kelly Markham-Coultes, Rikke Hahn Kofoed, H Uri Saragovi, Kullervo Hynynen and Isabelle Aubert. Brain. 2021.
- Apolipoprotein E4 allele as a predictor of cholinergic deficits and treatment outcome in Alzheimer disease. Judes Poirier, Marie-Claude Delisle, Remi Quirion, Isabelle Aubert, Martin Farlow, Debmoi Lahiri, Siu Hui, Philippe Bertrand, Josephine Nalbantoglu, and Brian M Gilfix. Proceedings of the National Academy of Sciences. 1995.
- Blood–brain barrier opening in Alzheimer's disease using MR-guided focused ultrasound. Nir Lipsman, Ying Meng, Allison J Bethune, Yuexi Huang, Benjamin Lam, Mario Masellis, Nathan Herrmann, Chinthaka Heyn, Isabelle Aubert, Alexandre Boutet, Gwenn S Smith, Kullervo Hynynen, and Sandra E Black. Nature Communications. 2018.
- Comparative alterations of nicotinic and muscarinic binding sites in Alzheimer's and Parkinson's diseases. I Aubert, DM Araujo, D Cecyre, Y Robitaille, S Gauthier, and R Quirion. Journal of neurochemistry. 1992.
