= Alexandre Savérien =

French mathematician

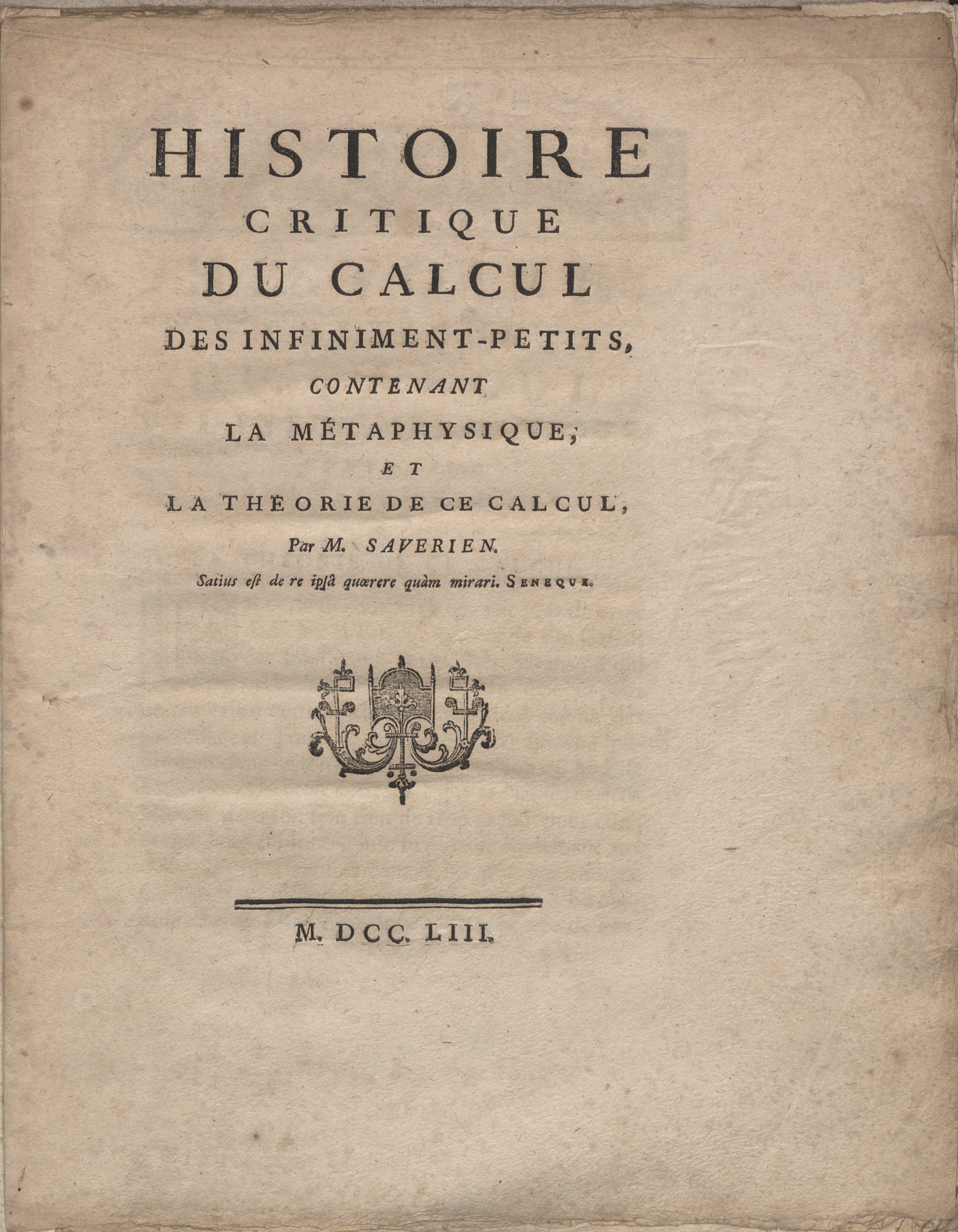
Histoire critique du calcul des infiniment-petits, 1753

Alexandre Julien Savérien (16 July 1720 – 3 May 1805) was a French mathematician who was also an expert in several other subject areas. He was born in Arles and became accomplished in both mathematics and naval engineering at a young age. in 1754, he published the Universal Dictionary of Mathematics and Physics and Histoire des philosophes modernes in 1773, where he named the nine greatest modern philosophers as Jakob Abbadie, Erasmus, Thomas Hobbes, Nicole, John Locke, Baruch Spinoza, Nicolas Malebranche, Bayle, Clarke, and Collins. He later became a member of the Academy of Lyon.

== Works ==
- Descartes (in Italian). Venezia: Antonio Graziosi. 1774.
