= Alain Cophignon =

French writer, photographer and aesthetician

Alain Cophignon (born 26 February 1963, in Paris) is a French writer, photographer and aesthetician.

== Biography ==
After having supported his doctoral thesis in the sciences of art at the Panthéon-Sorbonne University in 2000 under the presidency of Olivier Revault d'Allonnes, Cophignon was a professor of general culture and history of art at the Institut d'études supérieures des arts (IESA), Paris, and at the (EEGP) in Angers.

A member of the Société des gens de lettres and co-founder of the "Société musicale française Georges Enesco", he is the author of a monograph devoted to this Romanian musician who lived in France, published by Fayard, hailed by the French-speaking press, the Internet or audiovisual as well as foreign; He is a laureate of the "Kastner-Boursault" prize awarded by the Académie des Beaux-Arts 2006 and the Prix des Muses2007.

== Publications ==
- 2015: Annie Pelzak : Outre mer
- 2010: Sous le tourbillon des couleurs : Isabelle Langlois
- 2006: Georges Enesco, Librairie Arthème Fayard (Bibliothèque des grands compositeurs), Paris, 692 p. ISBN 978-2-213-62321-4 - George Enescu, translated into Romanian by Dominique Ilea, Éditions de l'Institut culturel roumain, Bucarest, 2009 ISBN 978-973-577-578-0
- 2003: Avant-propos to the work by George Bălan, Emil Cioran : la lucidité libératrice ?, Éditions Josette Lyon (Les Maîtres à penser du XXe), Paris, 234 p. ISBN 978-2-84319-038-4
- 1998/2001: L'œuvre musicale de Georges Enesco et sa pensée du destin, Proceedings of the international symposium "Georges Enesco" of musicology, Bucharest, and of the symposium of the International Academy of Villecroze
- 1999: La musique entre divertissement et défi existentiel : notes philosophiques, Actes du congrès international de Musicosophia, St. Peter, Germany
