= Lucien Jerphagnon =

French scholar, historian and philosopher (1921–2011)

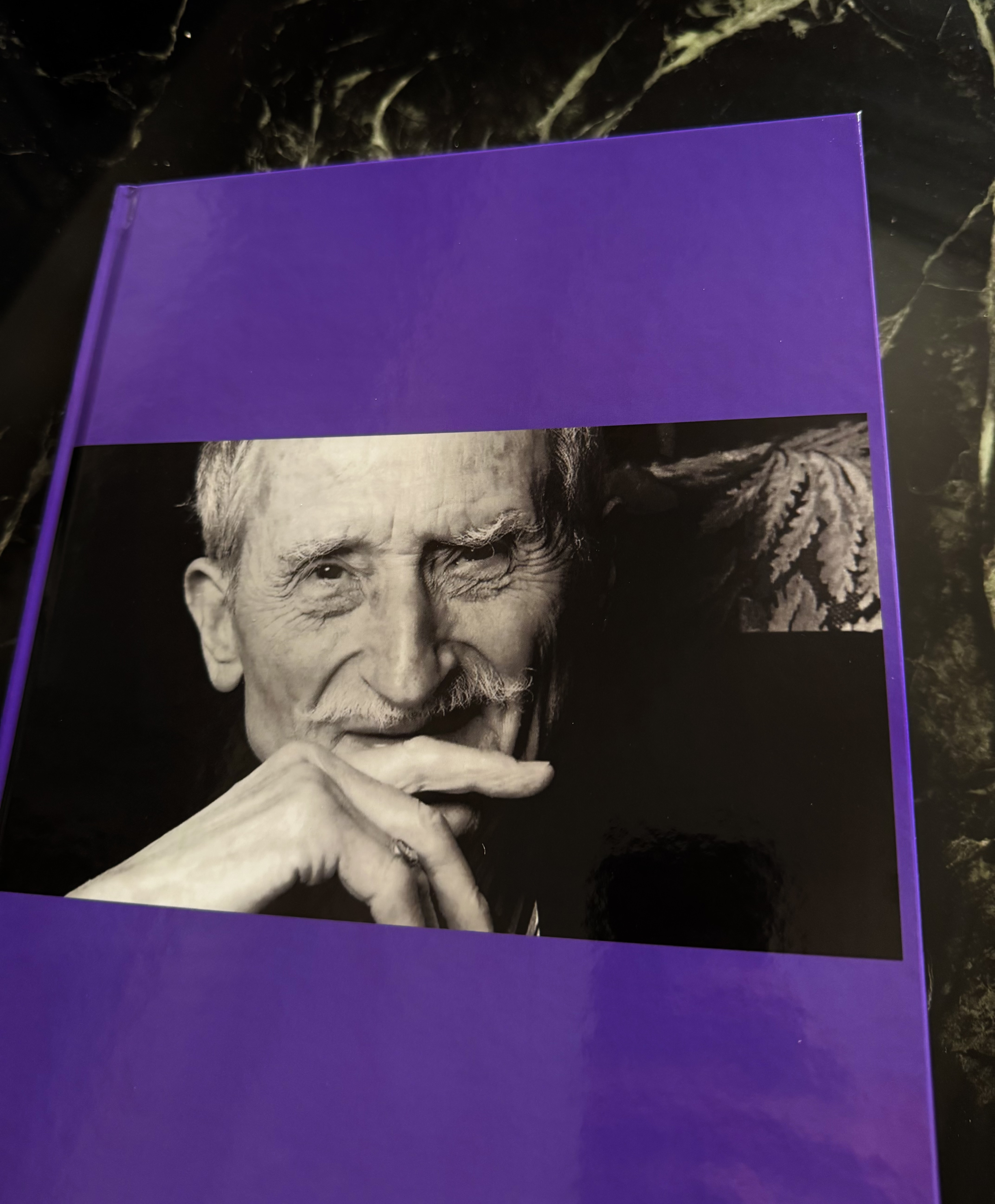
- Born: 7 September 1921; Nancy
- Died: 16 September 2011 (aged 90); Rueil-Malmaison

Philosophical work
- School: Historian of ancient philosophy

Lucien Jerphagnon (7 September 1921 – 16 September 2011) was a French scholar, historian and philosopher specialized in Greek and Roman philosophy.

== Biography ==
Lucien Jerphagnon was the son of Émile Jerphagnon, an engineer (1891–1975), and Jeanne, née Lallemand (1895–1927), who married on October 19, 1910. When he was only six years old, his mother died at the age of 32. His father remarried, and nine years later, Jean Jerphagnon (1936–2005) was born, who went on to have a distinguished career in telecommunications. Lucien Jerphagnon began his studies in Nancy and then continued at the Lycée in Bordeaux. During the Occupation, he was denounced as a draft dodger of the compulsory labor service (STO) and was deported to a munitions factory in Steyerberg, near Hanover (1943–1945).

After the Liberation, he studied theology and philosophy, then joined the abbey of Meaux. He was ordained as a priest on June 29, 1950. He then taught philosophy at the major seminary in Meaux from 1951 to 1961, at which point he chose to leave the priesthood. On February 3, 1962, Lucien Jerphagnon married Thérèse Noir (1934–2015). The couple had a daughter named Ariane. He continued his education at the École Pratique des Hautes Études (EPHE), writing his thesis under the supervision of Jean Orcibal, a renowned specialist in Jansenism and mysticism. Lucien Jerphagnon was a research associate at the CNRS (1961–1965), a lecturer at the Sorbonne (1961–1966), and at the Conservatoire National des Arts et Métiers (1965–1966). After dedicating a psychology thesis to Pascal, he defended his PhD in philosophy in 1965 under the supervision of Vladimir Jankélévitch, who was then his philosophy mentor (and whom he assisted). The thesis, "On Banalness: Essay on Ipseity and Its Lived Duration: Personal Duration and Co-Duration", was published the same year. In addition to Jankélévitch’s influence, he was also deeply marked by the work of Paul Veyne.

He taught philosophy at the Janson-de-Sailly high school and was appointed lecturer at the University of Franche-Comté in Besançon (1966–1970), while also serving as advisor to the International Institute of Philosophy (CNRS and UNESCO, 1966–1984). He then taught the History of Ancient and Medieval Philosophy at the University of Caen (1970–1984), where one of his students was Michel Onfray, who later paid tribute to him after his death. He retired in 1984 and was succeeded by Luc Ferry. Lucien Jerphagnon was also one of the founding members of the International Center for Platonic and Aristotelian Studies in Athens. He was a corresponding member of the Academy of Athens, the Academy of Sciences and Letters of Montpellier, and the Academy of Sciences, Arts and Letters of Caen. Lucien Jerphagnon is buried in the old cemetery of Rueil-Malmaison, next to his wife.

Among his numerous publications devoted to ancient Greece and Rome, he dedicated a monograph to Julian, known as the Apostate. In Living and Philosophizing under the Caesars (Vivre et philosopher sous les Césars, Grand Prix of the Académie française – 1980), he offers a “non-philosophical” history of ancient philosophy, showing how philosophers attempted to embody their moral and political principles in the tangible world. He also highlights the interest emperors took in philosophy as a means to strengthen their power. He is known for his “ambitious syntheses” (History of Ancient Rome, History of Thought: from Homer to Joan of Arc, The Divine Caesars), which have been reprinted many times. The result of twelve years of work, he oversaw the French edition of the three volumes of Saint Augustine's works for the prestigious Bibliothèque de la Pléiade collection at Gallimard (1998–2002). In 2019, the Bibliothèque nationale de France acquired the manuscripts of his works.

== Honours and awards ==
=== Honours ===
- Knight of the Legion of Honour
- Commander of the Ordre des Palmes académiques
- Commander of the Ordre des Arts et des Lettres

=== Awards ===
- 1981 : Estrade-Delcros Prize of the Académie Française
- 1999 : Moron Prize of the Académie des Sciences Morales et Politiques
- 2007 : Écritures & Spiritualités Award

=== Acknowledgements ===
- Member of the Academy of Athens (modern)
- Member of the Académie des Sciences, Arts et Belles-Lettres de Caen
- Member of the Montpellier Academy of Sciences and Letters

Lucien Jerphagnon truly left a significant intellectual legacy in ancient and Christian philosophy. His works offer an ambitious synthesis of classical thought and have influenced many students, including Michel Onfray. He is recognized for his contributions to ancient philosophy, his historical approach to thought under the Roman Empire, and his editing of the works of Saint Augustine, with particular attention to the heritage of Platonic and Aristotelian thought. One of his greatest merits lies in his ability to highlight the influence of philosophy on politics and morality within the Roman Empire, a theme he explores in depth in works like Living and Philosophizing under the Caesars. His reflection on the role of philosophers in Roman political life has provided a deeper understanding of the complex relationship between philosophical wisdom and imperial power. His expertise in editing and interpreting ancient texts also played a fundamental role in the dissemination of Augustinian thought, as evidenced by his three-volume edition of The Complete Works of Saint Augustine for the prestigious Bibliothèque de la Pléiade collection. This work, known for its rigor and depth, earned him several prestigious awards. His influence also extended to his teaching, particularly with students such as Michel Onfray, who paid tribute to him after his death. Despite his retirement from academia in 1984, Jerphagnon's legacy endures through his writings and contributions to the history of philosophy. He was able to refresh the study of antiquity with a contemporary perspective, which continues to nourish intellectual debate today. In summary, Lucien Jerphagnon left a lasting impact on philosophical and theological studies, and his work remains a reference for those interested in ancient philosophy, Christian thought, and their intersections.

Jean d'Ormesson defined him as follows: "A scholar who knows how to combine a swift and appealing style with the most rigorous erudition," finding in him "a familiar simplicity, often laced with humor, along with unfailing precision."

== Bibliography ==
Selected Works by Lucien Jerphagnon:

- Le Mal et l'Existence: réflexions pour servir à la pratique journalière (Evil and Existence: Reflections for Daily Practice), Paris, Les Éditions Ouvrières, 1955
- Pascal et la souffrance (Pascal and Suffering), Paris, Les Éditions Ouvrières, 1956
- Prières pour les jours intenables (Prayers for Unbearable Days), Les Éditions Ouvrières, 1956
- L'Homme et ses questions (Man and His Questions), Paris, Les Éditions du Virtail, 1958
- Servitude de la liberté? : liberté – providence – prédestination (The Servitude of Freedom? Freedom – Providence – Predestination), Paris, Fayard, 1958
- Pascal, Paris, Éditions Ouvrières, 1969
- Qu'est-ce que la personne humaine? : Enracinement, nature, destin (What Is the Human Person? Roots, Nature, Destiny), Paris, Privat, 1961
- Le Caractère de Pascal. Essai de caractérologie littéraire (The Character of Pascal. An Essay in Literary Characterology), Paris, PUF, 1962
- De la banalité. Essai sur l'ipséité et sa durée vécue (On Banalness. Essay on Ipseity and Its Lived Duration), Paris, Vrin, coll. « Problèmes et controverses », 1966 (reissued 2016, Vrin)
- Introduction à la philosophie générale (Introduction to General Philosophy), Paris, SEDES-CDU, 1968
- Vladimir Jankélévitch, ou de l'Effectivité (Vladimir Jankélévitch, or On Effectivity), Paris, Seghers, coll. « Philosophie de tous les temps », 1969
- Dictionnaire des grandes philosophies (Dictionary of Major Philosophies) [editor], Paris, Privat, 1973
- Histoire des grandes philosophies (History of Major Philosophies) [editor], Paris, Privat, 1980
- Vivre et philosopher sous les Césars (Living and Philosophizing under the Caesars), Paris, Privat, 1980 Awarded by the Académie française
- Vivre et philosopher sous l'Empire chrétien (Living and Philosophizing under the Christian Empire), Paris, Privat, 1981
- Julien, dit l'Apostat (Julian, Known as the Apostate), Paris, Seuil, 1986 (reissued with preface by Paul Veyne, Tallandier, 2008)
- Histoire de la Rome antique (History of Ancient Rome), Paris, Tallandier, 1987 (reissued Fayard Pluriel, 2016)
- Histoire de la Pensée Antiquité et Moyen Âge (History of Thought, Vol. 1: Antiquity and the Middle Ages), Paris, Tallandier, 1989 Awarded by the Académie des sciences morales et politiques
- Les Divins Césars. Étude sur le pouvoir dans la Rome impériale (The Divine Caesars: A Study on Power in Imperial Rome), Paris, Tallandier, coll. « Approches », 1991
- Œuvres de saint Augustin (Works of Saint Augustine) [editor], 3 vols., Paris, Gallimard, Bibliothèque de la Pléiade, 1998–2002 Awarded by the Académie française
- Saint Augustin. Le pédagogue de Dieu (Saint Augustine: God's Pedagogue), Paris, Gallimard, coll. « Découvertes Gallimard / Religions », No. 416, 2002
- Les dieux ne sont jamais loin (The Gods Are Never Far), Paris, Desclée de Brouwer, 2002
- Le Petit Livre des citations latines (The Little Book of Latin Quotations), Paris, Tallandier, 2004
- Augustin et la sagesse (Augustine and Wisdom), Paris, Desclée de Brouwer, 2006
- Au bonheur des sages (In the Happiness of the Wise), Paris, Hachette Littératures, 2007
- La Louve et l'Agneau (The She-Wolf and the Lamb), Paris, Desclée de Brouwer, 2007
- Laudator temporis acti (Praiser of Times Past), Paris, Tallandier, 2007
- Entrevoir et Vouloir : Vladimir Jankélévitch (To Glimpse and To Will: Vladimir Jankélévitch), Paris, Les Belles Lettres, 2008
- La Tentation du christianisme (The Temptation of Christianity, with Luc Ferry), Paris, Grasset, 2009
- La… Sottise ? (Vingt-huit siècles qu'on en parle) (Stupidity…? Twenty-Eight Centuries Talking About It), Paris, Albin Michel, 2010
- De l'amour, de la mort, de Dieu et autres bagatelles... (On Love, Death, God and Other Trifles – Interviews with Christiane Rancé), Paris, Albin Michel, 2011
- Les Armes et les mots (Weapons and Words – Preface by Jean d'Ormesson), Paris, Robert Laffont, coll. « Bouquins », 2012
- Connais-toi toi-même… Et fais ce que tu aimes (Know Thyself… and Do What You Love – Preface by Stéphane Barsacq), Paris, Albin Michel, 2012
- L’Homme qui riait avec les dieux (The Man Who Laughed with the Gods), Paris, Albin Michel, 2013
- Les Miscellanées d'un Gallo-Romain (Miscellanies of a Gallo-Roman), Paris, Perrin, 2014
- À l'école des Anciens (In the School of the Ancients), Paris, Perrin, 2014
- Mes Leçons d'antan : Platon, Plotin et le néoplatonisme (My Lessons of Yesteryear: Plato, Plotinus and Neoplatonism), Paris, Les Belles Lettres, 2014 (reissued 2015, preface by Michel Onfray, Fayard Pluriel)
- Entrevoir et vouloir : Vladimir Jankélévitch (To Glimpse and To Will: Vladimir Jankélévitch – Preface by F. Félix), Paris, Les Belles Lettres, coll. « encre marine », 2016
- L'Au-delà de tout (The Beyond of Everything – Preface by Cardinal Paul Poupard), Paris, Robert Laffont, coll. Bouquins, 2017
- L'Astre mort (The Dead Star – Preface by Ariane Jerphagnon), Paris, Robert Laffont, 2017
- L'Absolue Simplicité (Absolute Simplicity – Preface by Michel Onfray; Prologue by Ariane Jerphagnon), Paris, Robert Laffont, coll. Bouquins, 2019
