= List of memorials to Hannah Arendt =

List of places and things named for Hannah Arendt

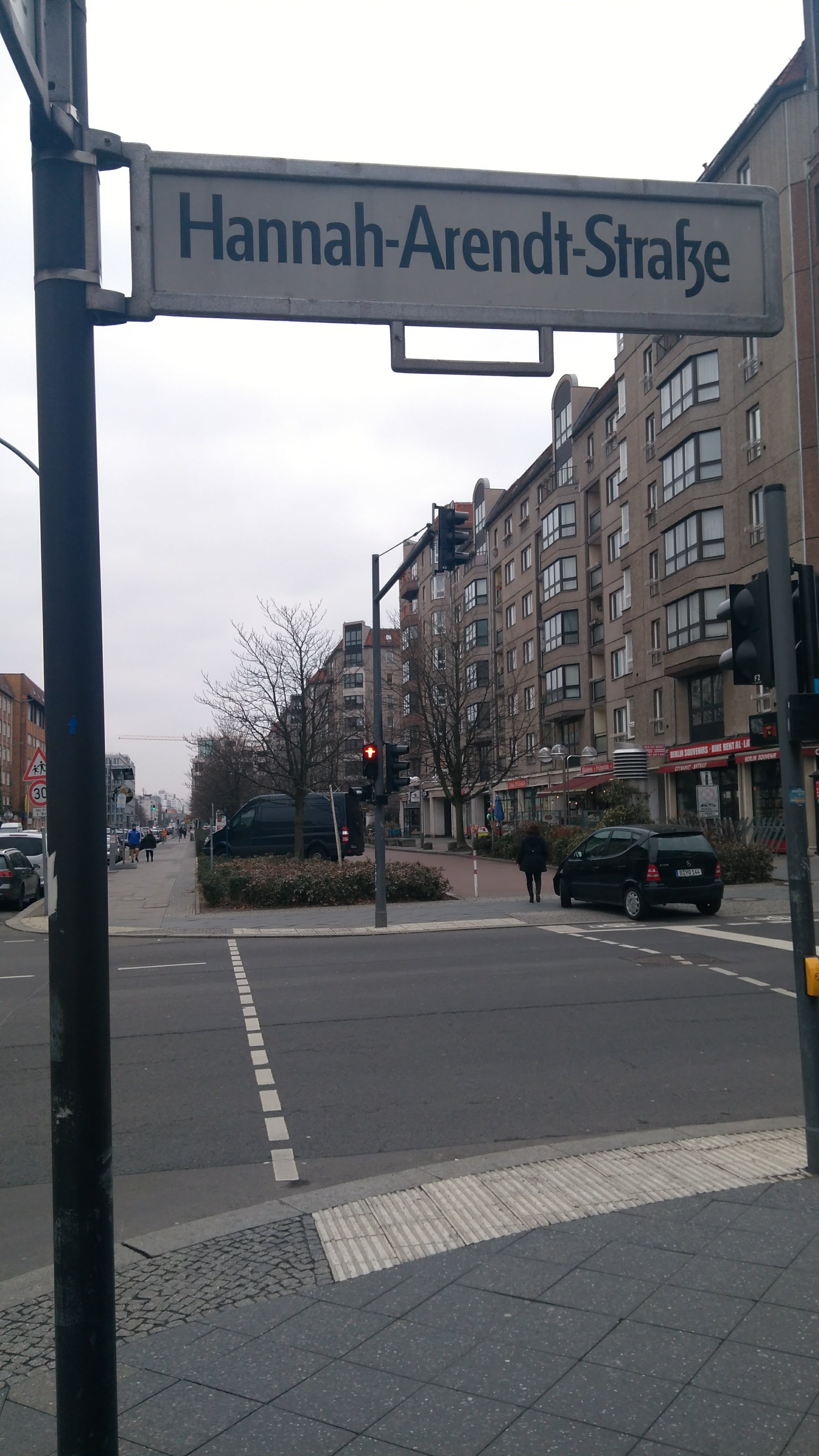
Hannah-Arendt Straße in Berlin

This list of memorials to Hannah Arendt includes the many objects or places named after or bearing memorial plaques to the life of the German-American Jewish political philosopher, Hannah Arendt (1906–1975).

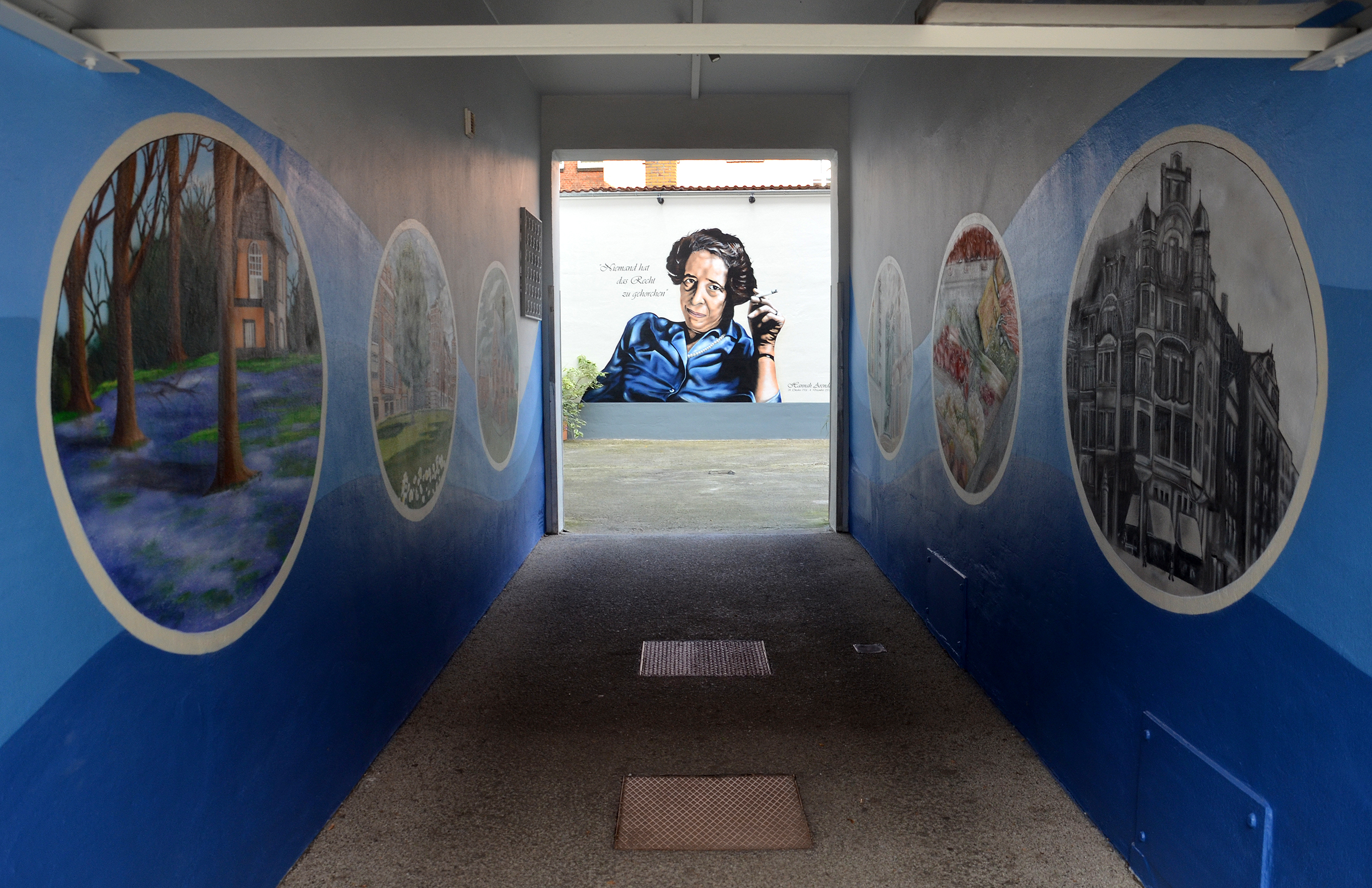
Courtyard of Arendt's house in Linden-Mitte

Many of the houses in which Hannah Arendt lived, bear commemorative plaques (Gedenktafeln), such as in Heidelberg, Marburg and Berlin. In 2017, Babelsberg announced it would erect a plaque on her home there. Her birth town of Linden, Hannover celebrates her name in a variety of ways, including a plaque. The city library has a Hannah Arendt Room, exhibiting her personal possessions. Her house bears a plaque, two schools and a road (Hannah-Arendt-Weg) near the town hall are named after her, as is the square in front of the state parliament (Hannah-Arendt-Platz). There is a Hannah Arendt Fellowship and a Hannah Arendt Chair at the Helene-Lange-Schule, while Hannover celebrates Hannah Arendt Days (Hannah Arendt Tagen). Her birthplace also has a mural on a wall in the courtyard, bearing the inscription Niemand hat das Recht zu gehorchen (No one has the right to obey), a saying often attributed to her as summarizing her verdict on Adolf Eichmann. Her contributions to resistance and rescue are commemorated at the Gedenkstätte Deutscher Widerstand (German Resistance Memorial Center) in Berlin.

Hannah Arendt has been honoured by the use of her name in many contexts, including:

- The asteroid 100027 Hannaharendt (1990).
- The Hannah Arendt Intercity Express train between Karlsruhe and her birthplace, Hanover.
- Several streets, areas and parks are named after Arendt in Germany and Austria, including Hannah-Arendt Straße in Berlin-Mitte, which runs beside the Holocaust memorial, Berlin near the Brandenburg Gate and the former Reich Chancellery, Hannah-Arendt Straße in Marburg[./List_of_memorials_to_Hannah_Arendt#cite_note-FOOTNOTEMeinestadt2018-7 [7]] and Hannah-Arendt-Park, in Vienna. In France there is a Place Hannah-Arendt (Paris) and many streets named Rue Hannah Arendt, including in Strasbourg and Tours.
- In addition to Hanover, a number of schools in Germany have been named after Hannah Arendt, including those at Haßloch, Barsinghausen, Lengerich (Westphalia) and Berlin.
- In 1988, the Deutsche Post issued a 170 Pf stamp (see image), as part of its Frauen der deutschen Geschichte series, and another was issued in 2006 to celebrate the centennial of her birth.
- In 2014, Google Doodle celebrated the 108th anniversary of her birth.
- In 2014, the French philosopher Michel Onfray devoted a series of lectures, broadcast on the national French radio station France Culture, to an analysis of the work of Arendt.
- In 2017, the former Casa del Fascio in Bolzano, adorned with a monumental fascist bas-relief, has been recontextualized with a superimposed inscription quoting Hannah Arendt.
- In 2018, a plaque on the corner of the street where she lived in Lisbon, to mark Human Rights Day (see image)

== Bibliography ==
- Kramer, Henri (1 March 2017). "Gedenktafel für Hannah Arendt in Babelsberg". Potsdamer Neueste Nachrichten (in German).
- "Hannah Arendt Tage". Das offizielle Portal der Region und der Landeshauptstadt Hannover. City of Hanover.
  - "Hannah Arendt in Hannover". Das offizielle Portal der Region und der Landeshauptstadt Hannover. City of Hanover. 22 August 2017.
- GDW (2016). "Hannah Arendt". Exile and Resistance. German Resistance Memorial Center.
- Aschheim, Steven E., ed. (2001). Hannah Arendt in Jerusalem [Hannah Arendt Beyerushalayim, Hebrew University of Jerusalem 2007 (in Hebrew)]. University of California Press. ISBN 978-0-520-22057-7.
  - Shenhav, Yehouda (3 May 2007). "All Aboard the Arendt Express". Haaretz (Review). Archived from the original on July 31, 2018.
- Laqueur, Walter (1998). "The Arendt Cult: Hannah Arendt as Political Commentator". Journal of Contemporary History. 33 (4): 483–496. doi:10.1177/002200949803300401. JSTOR 260982. S2CID 154222580., reprinted in Aschheim (2001, pp. 47–64)
- "Rue Hannah Arendt". Google Maps.
- "Hannah Arendt Gymnasium, Haßloch" (in German).
- "Hannah Arendt Gymnasium, Barsinghausen" (in German).
- "Hannah Arendt Gymnasium, Lengerich" (in German). Schulen in Lengerich. 2018.
- "Hannah Arendt Gymnasium, Berlin" (in German). 2018.
- Onfray, Michel (2014). "Contre-histoire de la philosophie - Saison 12: La pensée post-nazie" (Podcast). France Culture.
- Obermair, Hannes (April 2018). "Da Hans a Hannah—il "duce" di Bolzano e la sfida di Arendt" [From Hans to Hannah—Mussolini in Bolzano and Arendt's Challenge]. Il Cristallo. Rassegna di varia umanità (in Italian). Vol. 60, no. 1. pp. 27–32. ISBN 978-88-7223-312-2. ISSN 0011-1449.
- "Hannah Arendt's 108th Birthday". Google Doodle Archives. 14 October 2014.
- Paula, Luisa (28 December 2018). "Hannah Arendt em Lisboa". Espaço Crítico (in Portuguese).

=== External images ===
- "Hannah Arendt (1906—1975)" (Photograph of commemorative stamp). Internet Encyclopedia of Philosophy. 1988.
- "Hannah Arendt, stamp, Germany 2006" (Photograph of commemorative stamp). UNHCR. 2006.
- "Plaque". Lisbon City Council. 10 December 2018.
- "Map of location of Hannah Arendt Straße, Berlin". GeoHack (Map).
- "Hannah-Arendt-Str., Marburg". Meinestadt.de (in German). 2018.
