= Charles Lalo =

French writer on aesthetics

Charles Lalo (24 February 1877 in Périgueux – 1 April 1953 in Paris) was a French writer on aesthetics.

== Education and career ==
Lalo studied philosophy at the University of Paris, gaining a doctorate in 1908. After being a schoolmaster, he succeeded Victor Basch in the chair of aesthetics at the Sorbonne, which he held from 1933 until his death.

== Works ==
- Esquisse d'une esthétique musicale scientifique, 1908.
- Les sentiments esthétiques, 1909.
- Introduction à l'esthétique; les méthodes de l'esthétique, beauté naturelle et beauté artistique, l'impressionnisme et le dogmatisme, 1912.
- L'art et la vie sociale, 1921.
- L'art et la morale, 1922.
- Notions d'esthétique, 1925.
- L'expression de la vie dans l'art, 1933.
- Éléments d'une esthétique musicale scientifique, 1939.
- L'art loin de la vie, 1939.
- Esthétique du rire, 1949. * Metodi Estetike, Integralna Estetika, Predmeti Estetike, Nesvesne Strukture Estetike, Stvaranje i Konemplacija, Osnovni Zakoni 4 estetičke kategorije
