= Michel Malherbe =

French translator and philosopher (born 1941)

Michel Malherbe (born 1941) is a French translator and philosopher. A specialist of Anglo-Saxon empiricism, he has translated Bacon, Locke and Hume. He is director of the series "Analyse et philosophie" and "Bibliothèque des philosophies" by Vrin.

== Work ==
=== Bibliography ===
- La Philosophie empiriste de David Hume, Paris, Vrin, coll. Bibliothèque d'histoire de la philosophie, 1976.
- Kant ou Hume ou la Raison et le sensible, Vrin, coll. Bibliothèque d'histoire de la philosophie, 1980, 338 p. (ISBN 2-7116-0540-X for the 1993 reprint).
- Thomas Hobbes ou l'Œuvre de la raison, Vrin, coll. Bibliothèque d'histoire de la philosophie, 1984, 270 p., ISBN 2-7116-0835-2.
- Trois essais sur le sensible, Vrin, coll. Problèmes et controverses, 1991, 146 p., ISBN 2-7116-1101-9.
- Qu'est-ce que la causalité ? : Hume et Kant, Vrin, coll. Pré-textes, 1994, 126 p., ISBN 2-7116-1183-3.
- Des raisons de croire, Nantes, C. Defaut, 2006, 90 p., ISBN 2-350-18013-1 (texts from a conference delivered in 2005)
- Qu'est-ce que la politesse ?, Vrin, coll. Chemins Philosophiques, 2008, 128 p., ISBN 978-2-7116-1972-6
- D'un pas de philosophe, Vrin, coll. Matière étrangère, 2013, 304 p., ISBN 978-2-7116-2453-9

=== Translations ===
- David Hume, L'histoire naturelle de la religion : et autres essais sur la religion, Vrin, 1971, 139 p., ISSN 0249-7972 (texts selected in the context of a thesis defended in 1970)
- Dialogues sur la religion naturelle, Vrin, 1987, 158 p., ISBN 2-7116-0957-X
- Essais moraux, politiques et littéraires, Ire partie, Vrin, 1999, ISBN 2-7116-1349-6 (introduction, translation and notes)
- Système sceptique et autres systèmes, Le Seuil, 2002, 338 p., ISBN 2-02-041937-8 (préeentation, translation and commentaries)
- Essais moraux, politiques et littéraires, IIe partie, Vrin, 2009, ISBN 978-2-7116-2247-4 (introduction, translation and notes)
- Enquête sur l'entendement humain, bilingual edition, Paris, Vrin, 2008, 420 p., ISBN 978-2-7116-1990-0 (introduction, translation and notes)
- Francis Bacon, Novum Organum, Presses universitaires de France, coll. Épiméthée, 1986, 349 p., ISBN 2-13-039441-8 (translated with Jean-Marie Pousseur)
- Étienne Bonnot de Condillac, Traité des animaux, Vrin, 2004, 253 p., ISBN 2-7116-1665-7
