= Revue philosophique de Louvain =

Journal

The Revue philosophique de Louvain was founded in 1894 by Désiré Mercier as the Revue Néoscolastique. It is now published by the Higher Institute of Philosophy at the University of Louvain (UCLouvain). The journals publishes on the international philosophical movements in the broadest sense.

The journal is a source of research and discussion through its articles; a source of documentation and critics by its "bulletins", its book reviews and book notes; a source of information through its various chronicles. The Revue philosophique de Louvain aims to be a working instrument as certain and complete as possible in the philosophical research field.
