= Judith E. Schlanger =

French writer and philosopher (born 1936)

Judith Epstein Schlanger (born 1936) is a French writer and philosopher. She is Chaim Perelman Professor Emeritus of Philosophy at the Hebrew University of Jerusalem. She has written over a dozen books on intellectual invention.

== Works ==
- Schelling et la réalité finie, essai sur la philosophie de la nature et de l'identité, 1966
- Les métaphores de l'organisme, 1971.
- Penser la bouche pleine, 1975.
- L'invention intellectuelle, 1979.
- (with Isabelle Stengers) Les concepts scientifiques: invention et pouvoir, 1991
- La mémoire des oeuvres, 1992.
- Présence des oeuvres perdues, 2010.
- Trop dire ou trop peu: La densité littéraire, 2016.
