= Jacques Rennes =

French philosopher and veterinarian

Jacques Rennes (9 October 1875 – 3 August 1970) was a French philosopher and veterinarian.
