= Rainer Rochlitz =

French translator and art historian

Rainer Rochlitz (1946–2002) was a French translator and art historian.

A specialist in aesthetics, Rochlitz contributed a great deal in publicizing the writings of Georg Lukács, Walter Benjamin and Jürgen Habermas in France. He was a researcher at the Centre National de la Recherche Scientifique in Paris and director of seminars at the École des Hautes Études en Sciences Sociales.
