= Pierre Laromiguière =

French philosopher (1756–1837)

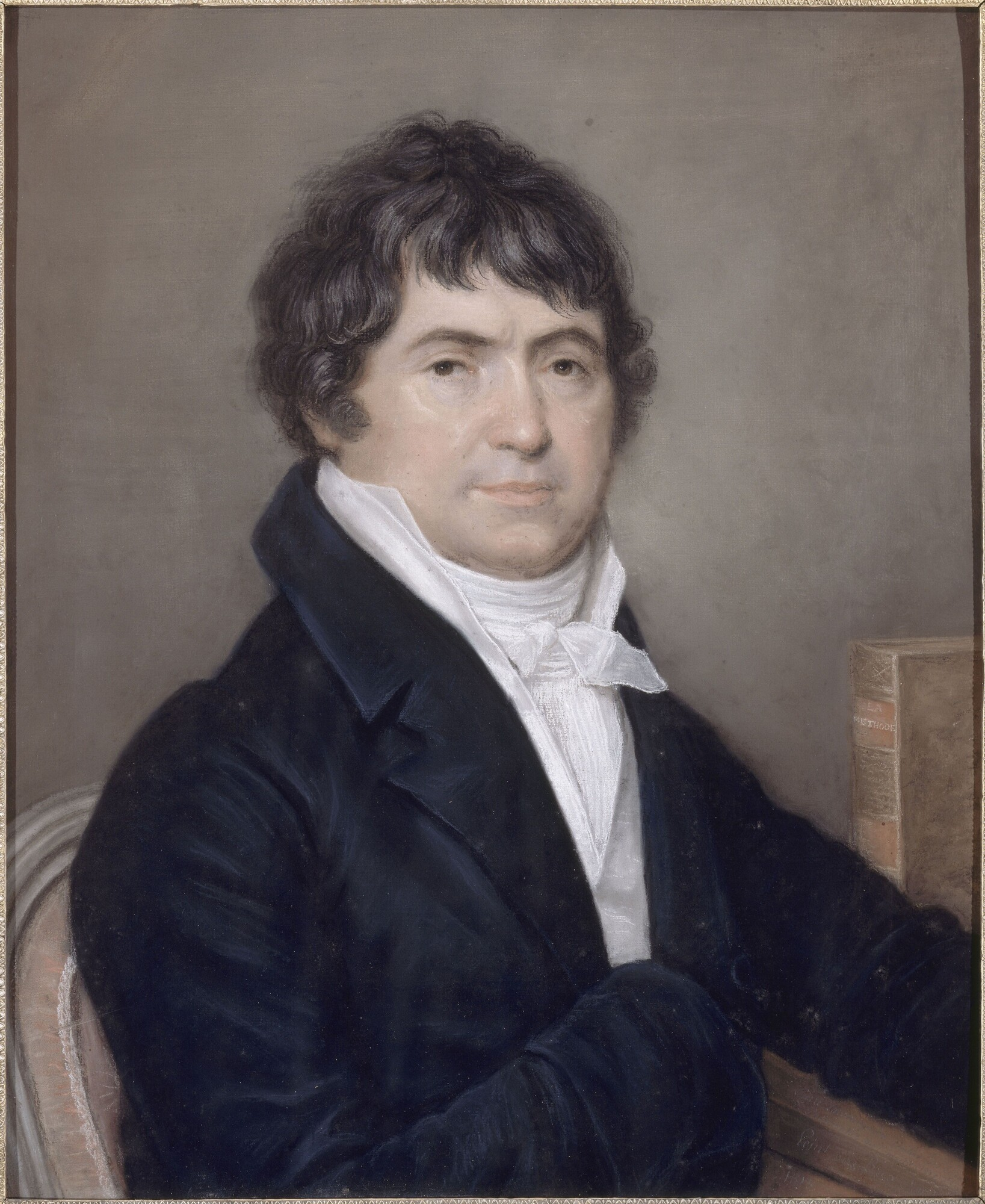
Pierre Laromiguière

Pierre Laromiguière (French: [laʁɔmiɡjɛʁ]; 3 November 1756 – 12 August 1837) was a French philosopher.

== Life ==
He was born at Livinhac-le-Haut, Rouergue. As professor of philosophy at the University of Toulouse, he was unsuccessful and incurred the displeasure of the French parliament by his thesis on the rights of property in connection with taxation. Subsequently, he came to Paris, where he was appointed professor of logic in the École Normale and lectured in the Prytanée. In 1799, he was made a member of the Tribunate, and in 1833 of the Academy of Moral and Political Science. In 1793, he published Projet d'éléments de métaphysique, a work characterized by lucidity and excellence of style. He also wrote two Mémoires, read before the Institute, Les Paradoxes de Condillac (1805) and Le cours de philosophie (1815–1818).

Laromiguière's philosophy is a revolt against the extreme physiological psychology of the natural scientists, such as Cabanis. He distinguished between those psychological phenomena which can be traced directly to purely physical causes, and the actions of the soul which originate from within itself. Psychology was not for him a branch of physiology, nor on the other hand did he give to his theory an abstruse metaphysical basis. A pupil of Condillac and indebted for much of his ideology to Antoine Destutt de Tracy, he attached a fuller importance to "attention" as a psychic faculty. Attention provides the facts, Comparison groups and combines them, while Reason systematizes and explains. The soul is active in its choice, i.e., is endowed with freewill, and is, therefore, immortal.

For natural science as a method of discovery, he had no respect. He held that its judgments are, at the best, statements of identity, and that its so-called discoveries are merely the reiteration, in a new form, of previous truisms. Laromiguière was not the first to develop these views; he owed much to Condillac, Destutt de Tracy and Cabanis. The accuracy of his language and the purity of his style gave his works great influence, especially over Armand Marrast, Louis Cardaillac and Victor Cousin. A lecture of his in the École Normale impressed Cousin so strongly that he at once devoted himself to the study of philosophy. Jouffroy and Hippolyte Taine agree in describing him as one of the great thinkers of the 19th century.

Laromiguière died in Paris.

== Sources ==
- ; Endnotes:
  - Damiron, Essai sur la Philosophie en France au XIX' siècle
  - Biran, Examen des leçons de philosophie
  - Victor Cousin, De Methodo siva de Analysis
  - Daunou, Notice sur Laromiguière
  - H. Taine, Les Philosophes classiques du XIX siècle
  - Gatien-Arnoult, Etude sur Laromiguière
  - Gabriel Compayré, Notice sur Laromiguière
  - Marin Ferraz, Spiritualisme et Libéralisme
  - F. Picavet, Les Idéologues.
