= George Joseph Gustave Masson =

French-English educational writer (1819–1888)

George Joseph Gustave Masson (9 March 1819 – 29 August 1888), was an English-born educational writer with a French father and an English mother.

== Life ==
He was born in London on 9 March 1819. His father had served under Napoleon I, and survived the retreat from Moscow; his mother was of English origin. Gustave was educated at Tours, was exempted from military service as eldest son of a widow, and was awarded the diploma of 'Bachelier ès Lettres' by the University of France on 8 August 1837. After some ten years of literary struggle in Paris, he came to England as tutor to the two sons of Captain Trotter of the Woodlands, Harrow, and was in 1855 appointed by Dr. Charles Vaughan, headmaster of Harrow School, French master there. He proved himself a good organiser, and took a prominent part in the life of the school. He was from 1869 Vaughan librarian and published a catalogue.

Masson was an author and translator on a large scale, writing many books on French literature and history, and editing with much success numerous French classics for English students. He was at the same time a frequent contributor to the Athenæum, and supplied the notes on French literature to the Saturday Review from soon after its foundation until 1880. He gave up his Harrow mastership in the autumn of 1888, and died a few weeks later on 29 August at Ewhurst, Surrey, while on a visit to Sir Henry Doulton; he was buried in Harrow churchyard.

== Family ==
By his wife, whose maiden name was Janet Clarke, and whom he married in 1843, he left two sons and two daughters.

== Works ==
=== Trade editions ===
- A Chronological and Historical Atlas of the Middle Ages, London: Partridge and Oakey, 1849
- Introduction to the History of French Literature, Edinburgh: Adam and Charles Black, 1860
- La Lyre française, London: Macmillan & Co., 1867, 1928 (Golden Treasury) - poetry anthology
- A Compendious Dictionary of the French Language, London: Macmillan & Co., 1874
- Outlines of French Literature, London: Dulau & Co.; London: Hachette & Co., 1877
- Early Chroniclers of Europe: France, London: Society for Promoting Christian Knowledge, 1879 (Early Chroniclers of Europe)
- Francis I. and the Sixteenth Century, London: Sampson Low, Marston (Episodes of French History); Boston: Estes & Lauriat, 1881 (Episodes of French History)
- The Huguenots: A Sketch of their History from the Beginning of the Reformation to the Death of Louis XIV, London: Cassell, Petter, Galpin, 1881 (Cassell's Popular Library)
- Richelieu, London: Society for Promoting Christian Knowledge, c. 1884 (The Home Library)
- Mazarin, London: Society for Promoting Christian Knowledge, 1886 (The Home Library, vols. 3, 5 and 7) - based on Cheruel's Histoire de la France pendant la minorité de Louis XIV (4 vols., 1880)
- French Literature, London: Society for Promoting Christian Knowledge, 1888 (Dawn of European Literature)
- Outlines of the History of France, From the Earliest Times to the Outbreak of the Revolution, Boston: Estes and Lauriat, 1886
- Mediaeval France from the Reign of Hugues Capet to the Beginning of the 16th Century , London: T. Fisher Unwin, 1888 (The Story of the Nations)

=== Translations from the French ===
- Paul Janet, The Materialism of the Present Day: A Critique of Dr. Büchner's System, London: Williams and Norgate, 1865
- Elme Marie Caro, George Sand, London: Routledge, 1888 (Great French Writers)
- Albert Sorel, Montesquieu, London: Routledge, 1888 (Great French Writers)
- Léon Say, Turgot, London: Routledge, 1888 (Great French Writers)
- Jules Simon, Victor Cousin, London: George Routledge and Sons, 1888 (Great French Writers)
- George Sand, Francis the Waif (François le champi), London: George Routledge and Sons, 1889 - limited edition of 1000 copies

=== Translations into the French ===
- Samuel White Baker, Découverte de l'Albert N' yanza : nouvelles explorations des sources du Nil, Paris: Librairie de L. Hachette et Cie., 1868 (copyright date: 1867)

=== Language manuals ===
- The Public School Elementary French Grammar, Toronto : J. Campbell, 1878. Joint authors: Auguste Brachet and P. H. E. Brette.

=== School editions of French literary classics ===
- Madame de Sévigné, A Selection from the Letters of Madame de Sévigné and Her Contempories [sic], Oxford: Clarendon Press, 1868 (French Classics Series)
- Jean-François Regnard et al., A Selection of Plays by Regnard, Brueys and Palaprat, Oxford: Clarendon Press, 1875 (French Classics Series)
- Madame de Staël, Dix années d'exil, Cambridge: University Press, 1876 (Pitt Press Series)
- Victor Hugo, Hernani : drame en cinq actes. With explanatory notes, London: Dulau, c. 1876 (Le théâtre français du XIXe siècle)
- Edmond About, Edmond About, London: Hachette & cie., 1882 (Hachette's Series of Modern French Authors, For the Use of Young People)
- Pierre Corneille, Cinna : ou, La clémence d'Auguste, tragédie, 1639. Edited with notes, glossary, etc., Oxford: Clarendon Press, 1886 (Clarendon Press Series)
- Xavier de Maistre, Voyage autour de ma chambre, Oxford: Clarendon Press, 1887 (Clarendon Press Series)

Further Masson titles in the Clarendon Press Series are listed here

=== School readers ===
- The Poets and Prose Writers of France : From the Earliest Period to the Beginning of the Present Century : With Biographical Notices, Explanatory Notes, Synoptical Tables, Edinburgh: Adam and Charles Black, 1868
- A Class-book of French Literature : From the Earliest Period to the Beginning of the Present Century, Edinburgh: A. and C. Black, 1878
- Choice Readings from French History, London: Hachette, 1880–83
- Louis XIV & His Contemporaries : A Series of Extracts from Memoirs of the Seventeenth Century, Oxford: Clarendon Press, 1888 (French Classics Series)
- Select Tales by Modern French Writers, Oxford: Clarendon Press, 1888 (French Classics Series)
