= Pradines =

Pradines may refer to:

- Maurice Pradines, a French philosopher
- places in France:
  - Pradines, Corrèze, a commune in the department of Corrèze
  - Pradines, Loire, a commune in the department of Loire
  - Pradines, Lot, a commune in the department of Lot
