= Philipp Albert Stapfer =

Swiss politician and philosopher

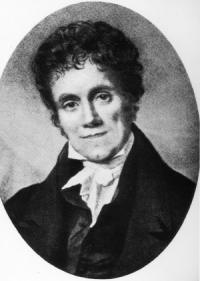
Philipp Albert Stapfer.

Philipp Albert Stapfer (23 September 1766, Bern – 27 March 1840, Paris) was a Swiss politician and philosopher.

He was the plenipotentiary envoi of the Helvetic Republic to the French Consulate in Paris from 1801 till 1803. (Act of Mediation)

He married and settled in France, at the Chateau de Talcy (Loir-et-Cher) and in Paris where he became the friend of Maine de Biran in 1805 at informal gatherings of Cabanis circle at Auteuil. He was also vice-president of the Paris Protestant society.

He is the recipient of Maine de Biran's essay:

"Réponses aux arguments contre l'aperception immédiate d'une liaison causale entre le vouloir primitif et la motion et contre la dérivation d'un principe universel et nécessaire de causalités de cette source." (1818);

an important résumé known as: "Réponses à Stapfer".

== Pestalozzi ==
Philipp Albert Stapfer also shared with Maine de Biran a pronounced interest in the educational experiments of Johann Heinrich Pestalozzi.

As a Minister of Sciences and Arts of the Helvetic Republic in 1798 he arranged the nomination of Pestalozzi as chief editor of the government paper "Helvetisches Volksblatt" - a post from which Pestalozzi quickly resigned.

In Paris Stapfer pleaded Pestalozzi's case for educational reform with Napoleon Bonaparte, who denigrated the program for its alleged lack of real science.

Maine de Biran however - following the encounters with Stapfer at Auteuil and his own appointment as "sous-préfet" of the Dordogne in 1806 - reformed the education in his department by inviting to Bergerac a teacher formed by Pestalozzi at Yverdon.

== Philosopher ==
Apart from being an involved and tolerant Protestant philosopher Stapfer, with André-Marie Ampère, Joseph-Marie de Gérando, Pierre Paul Royer-Collard, Georges Cuvier and many others was a regular participant in the philosophical debates organised by Maine de Biran, after the latter finally settled in Paris as an administrator in 1812.

Together with Degérando, who introduced Kant studies in France, he was one of Maine de Biran's main sources on the philosophy of Immanuel Kant whose work he followed in its development by one of Kant's pupils: Friedrich Bouterwek (1766-1828), professor in Philosophy at the Georg August University in Göttingen. Meyers Lexicon (Mannheim 1990) links Bouterwek with Maine de Biran. Bouterwek was already lecturing on Kant at Göttingen when Stapfer studied there in 1789-1790.

The extent of Stapfer's knowledge of Kant can be judged from the substantial (pagelong) notes he appended to Maine de Biran's: "Exposition de la doctrine philosophique de Leibniz. Composée pour la Biographie Universelle" (Paris: Michaud ed. 1819). This exposition written at the instigation of Stapfer is one of only two (authorised) philosophical texts by Maine de Biran published during his lifetime. (Stapfer's notes were republished by Pierre Tisserand in his Oeuvres de Maine de Biran, 1939 -Tome XI pp. 435–489)

Stapfer long survived his immediate contemporaries de Biran and Bouterwek. He arranged for his own salon, inviting guests such as Victor Cousin, Sainte-Beuve, Guizot to whom he became an important material witness of the preceding decades.

It took the untiring persistence of Stapfer to encourage Victor Cousin and Joseph Lainé to classify and publish the works of Maine de Biran.

== Writings ==
- De la lecture de la Bible, particulièrement de l'Ancien Testament: et des fruits que les hommes de toutes les capacités peuvent en recueillir, même sans le secours de notes et de commentaires (1821)
- Considérations sur les rapports de la lecture universelle et intégrale des Saintes Ecritures avec l'état moral des individus, le bonheur des peuples, et la cause du Christianisme (1823)
- Mélanges philosophiques, littéraires, historiques et religieux (1844)
