= Picavet =

Picavet may refer to:

- François Picavet (1851–1921), French philosopher
- Picavet suspension, a type of suspension used in kite aerial photography
