= Sensationalism (disambiguation) =

Sensationalism is a journalistic and media practice involving exaggerated or emotionally charged presentation of events to attract attention, typically in news media.

Sensationalism may also refer to:

- Sensationalism (philosophy), a philosophical doctrine holding that sensation and sense perception are fundamental to the origin of knowledge
- Sensationalism (literature), a literary genre of fiction that achieved popularity in Great Britain in between the mid 1850s and mid to late 1890s
