= Elme Marie Caro =

French philosopher (1826–1887)

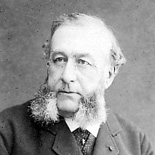
- Born: 4 March 1826; Poitiers, Vienne, France
- Died: 13 July 1887 (aged 61); Paris, France
- Spouse: Pauline Cassin

Education
- Education: Collège Stanislas de Paris; École Normale Supérieure
- Academic advisors: Émile Saisset; Jules Simon

Philosophical work
- Era: 19th-century philosophy
- Region: Western philosophy
- School: French spiritualism
- Notable students: Théodule-Armand Ribot

Elme Marie Caro (4 March 1826 – 13 July 1887) was a French philosopher.

== Life ==
His father, a professor of philosophy, gave him an education at the Stanislas College and the École Normale Supérieure, where he graduated in 1848. After being professor of philosophy at several provincial universities, he received the degree of doctor in 1852 on the subject of Louis Claude de Saint-Martin, and came to Paris in 1858 as master of conferences at the École Normale Supérieure.

In 1861 he became inspector of the Académie française, in 1864 professor of philosophy to the Faculty of Letters, and in 1874 a member of the Académie française. He married Pauline Cassin, the author of Le Péché de Madeleine and other well-known novels.

In his philosophy, he was mainly concerned to defend Christianity against modern Positivism. The philosophy of Victor Cousin influenced him strongly, but his strength lay in exposition and criticism rather than in original thought.

He wrote important contributions to La France and the Revue des deux Mondes.

== Selected publications ==
- Du mysticisme au XVIII^{e} siècle (1852–1854)
- Études morales sur le temps présent (1855)
- L'Idée de Dieu (1864)
- Le matérialisme et la science (1867)
- Jours d'épreuve (1872)
- Le Pessimisme au XIX^{e} siècle (1878)
- La Philosophie de Goethe (2nd ed., 1880)
- La fin du dix-huitième siècle (1881)
- M. Littré et le positivisme (1883)
- George Sand (1887)
- Mélanges et portraits (1888)
