= Jules Lequier =

French philosopher (1814–1862)

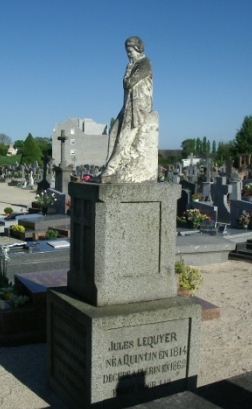
- A statue of Lequier in Côtes-d'Armor
- Born: 30 January 1814; Quintin, France
- Died: 11 February 1862 (aged 48); Plérin, France
- Other name: Jules Lequyer

Education
- Education: École Polytechnique (attended)
- Academic advisor: Jules Barthélemy-Saint-Hilaire

Philosophical work
- Era: 19th-century philosophy
- Region: Western philosophy
- School: French spiritualism
- Main interests: Metaphysics, philosophy of religion
- Notable ideas: Double aspect of necessity (natural determinism and divine prescience)

Jules Lequier (or Lequyer, French: [ləkɥije]; 30 January 1814 – 11 February 1862) was a French philosopher from Brittany. He was a proponent of French spiritualism.

Lequier was born in Quintin and died in Plérin apparently by suicide, after swimming out to sea.

== Philosophical work ==
Lequier wrote in favour of dynamic divine omniscience, wherein God's knowledge of the future is one of possibilities rather than actualities. Omniscience, under this view, is the knowledge of necessary facts as necessary, and contingent facts as contingent. Since the future does not yet exist as anything more than a realm of abstract possibilities, it is no impugning of divine omniscience to claim that God does not know the future as a fixed and unalterable state of affairs: that he does not know what is not there to be known. Lequier's approach guarantees both divine and human freedom, and suggests a partial resolution of the apparent inconsistency of human-wrought evil and the perfect goodness, power and knowledge of God.

== Fragments translated into English ==
- Translation of Works of Jules Lequyer: The Hornbeam Leaf, The Dialogue of the Predestinate and the Reprobate, Eugene and Theophilus (Lewiston, New York: Edwin Mellen Press, 1998).
- Jules Lequyer’s "Abel and Abel" Followed by "Incidents in the Life and Death of Jules Lequyer" (Lewiston, New York: Edwin Mellen Press, 1999).
