= L'Arrêt de mort =

1948 novel by Maurice Blanchot

Death Sentence
- Cover of 1948 French Edition.
- Author: Maurice Blanchot
- Original title: L'Arrêt de mort
- Translator: Lydia Davis
- Language: French; English
- Publisher: Gallimard
- Publication date: 1948
- Publication place: France
- English publication date: 1978
- Media type: Print
- Pages: 81 pp.
- ISBN: 978-0-930794-04-0 (Paperback)
- OCLC: 4887811
- LC Class: PQ2603.L3343 A813x 1978

Death Sentence (French: L'Arrêt de mort) is a philosophical novel by Maurice Blanchot. First published in 1948, it is his second complete work of fiction.
