= Pauline Cassin Caro =

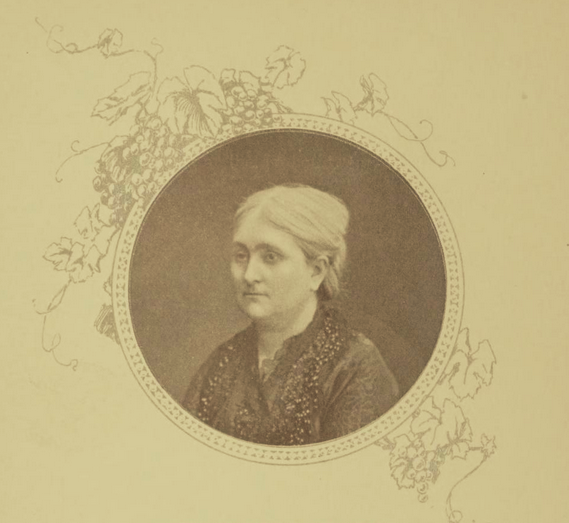
- Born: Pauline Cassin; 1828/34/35
- Died: 28 January 1901; Paris, France
- Occupation: Novelist
- Spouse: Elme Marie Caro (d. 1887)
- Children: 1
- Writing career
- Pen name: P. Albane
- Language: French

Signature
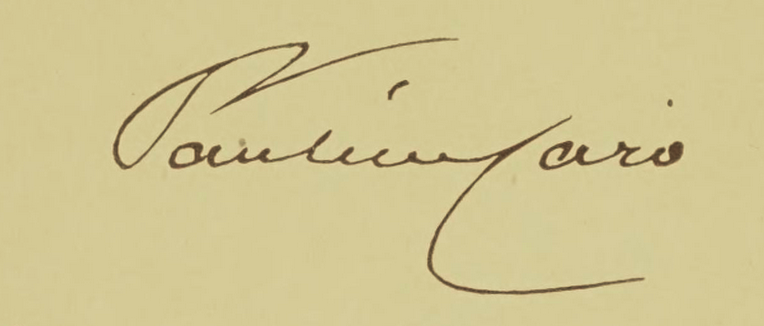

Pauline Cassin Caro (née Cassin; pen name, P. Albane; 1828/34/35 – 28 January 1901) was a French Catholic novelist. She wrote under her own name and using the pseudonym, "P. Albane". Caro died in 1901.

== Biography ==
Pauline (Note: Bazin (1899) mistakenly records her given name as "Caroline".) Cassin was born in 1828/34/35. Her father was a functionary in the university and while still young, he died from a typhoid epidemic. A brother and sister died within a few months thereafter. Long afterwards, her only child, a daughter, died at the age of 23. Then Mrs. Caro's mother died, and finally her husband, Elme Marie Caro (1887), who had been a member of the Académie Française, leaving the widow alone in the world.

She wrote four novels under a fictitious name: Le Peche de Madeleine, Flamen, Histoire de Souci, and Les Nouvelles Amours d'Hermann et de Dorothee. Fifteen years afterwards, she resumed her writing and published, Amour de Jeune Fille, Complice!, Fausse Route, Fruits Amers, L'Idole, Les Lendemains.

She died in Paris, 28 January 1901.

== Selected works ==
- Le Péché de Madeleine, 1865
- Flamen, 1866
- Histoire de Souci, 1868
- Les Nouvelles Amours d'Hermann et de Dorothee, 1872
- Amour de Jeune Fille, 1892
- Complice!, 1893
- La Fausse Route, 1890
- Fruits Amers, 1892
- L'Idole, 1894
- Les Lendemains, 1895
- Idylle nuptiale, 1897
- Pas à pas, 1898
- Aimer c'est vaincre: roman illustré de 42 dessins d'apès ..., 1904
