= Paul Janet =

French philosopher and writer (1823–1899)

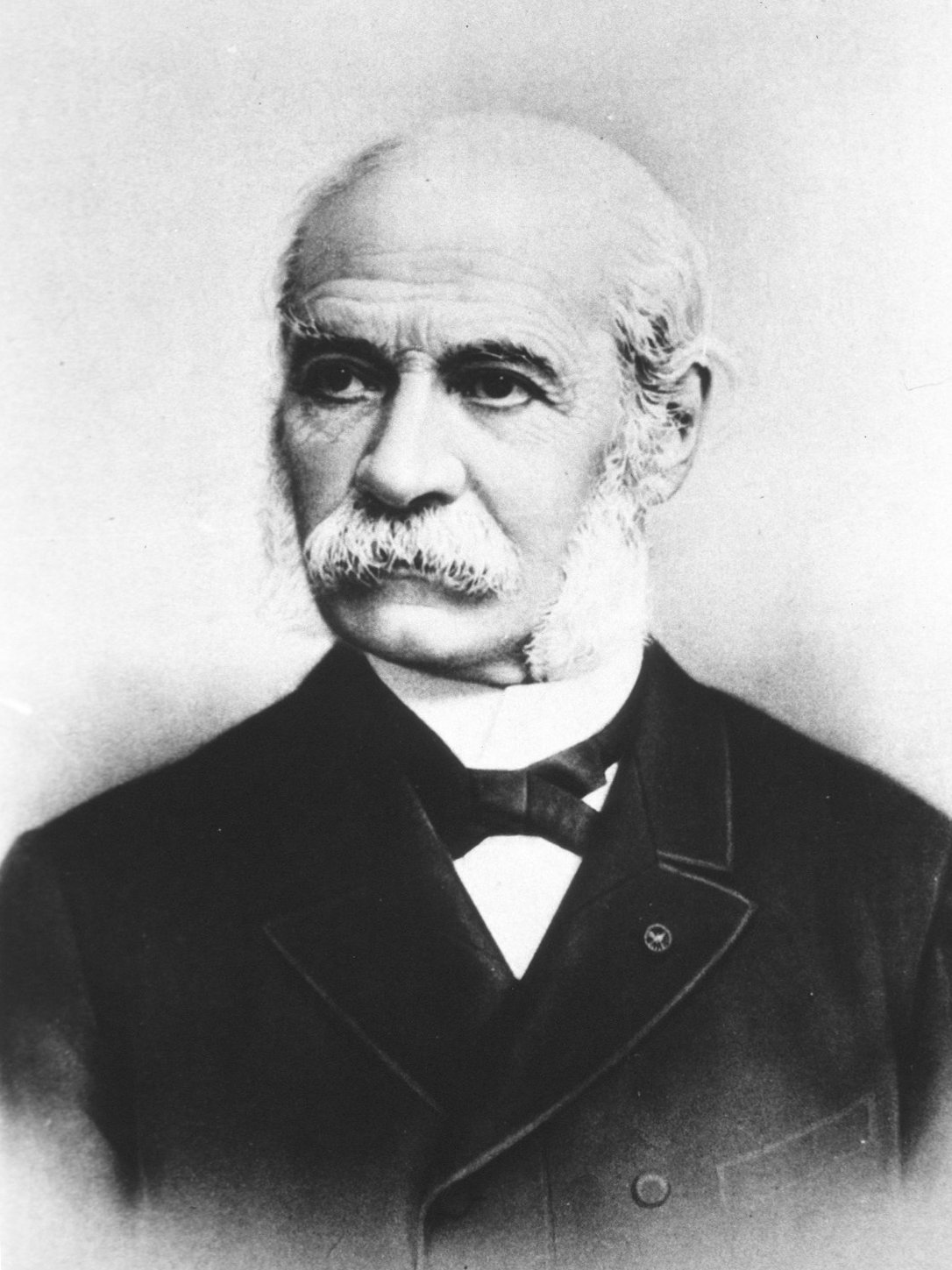
- Born: Paul Alexandre René Janet; 30 April 1823; Paris, France
- Died: 4 October 1899 (aged 76); Paris, France

Education
- Education: École Normale Supérieure
- Academic advisor: Victor Cousin

Philosophical work
- Era: 19th-century philosophy
- Region: Western philosophy
- School: French spiritualism
- Institutions: University of Bourges; University of Strasbourg; University of Paris
- Doctoral students: Henri Bergson
- Main interests: Metaphysics, ethics

Paul Alexandre René Janet (French: [pɔl alɛksɑ̃dʁ ʁəne ʒanɛ]; 30 April 1823 – 4 October 1899) was a French philosopher and writer.

== Biography ==
Born in Paris, he became professor of moral philosophy at the University of Bourges (1845–1848) and the University of Strasbourg (1848–1857), and of logic at the Lycée Louis-le-Grand, Paris (1857–1864). In 1864 he was appointed to the chair of philosophy at the Sorbonne, and elected a member of the academy of moral and political sciences.

He wrote widely on philosophy, politics and ethics, on idealistic lines: La Famille, Histoire de la philosophie dans l'antiquité et dans le temps moderne, Histoire de la science politique, and Philosophie de la Révolution Française. However, in the opinion of Encyclopædia Britannica (11th edition, 1911), these writings are not characterised by much originality of thought. In philosophy, he was a follower of Victor Cousin, and through him of G. W. F. Hegel. His principal work, La morale (1874), owes much to Immanuel Kant.

Charles Darwin was familiar with Janet's ideas, but thought that he had not well understood the theory of natural selection, as he indicated in a letter of 1866 to Alfred Russel Wallace:

As for M. Janet he is a metaphysician & such gentlemen are so acute that I think they often misunderstand common folk.

Paul was the uncle of Pierre Janet.

== Works ==
- The Materialism of the Present Day, a Critique of Dr. Büchner's System, London: Williams and Norgate, 1865 (translated of the original French work into English by George Masson), ISBN 1152057863
