= René Le Senne =

French philosopher (1882–1954)

René Le Senne (French: [lə sɛn]; born Ernest René Lesenne; 8 July 1882, Elbeuf – 1 October 1954, Neuilly-sur-Seine) was a French idealist philosopher and psychologist.

== Publications ==
- Obstacle et valeur, Paris, F. Aubier 1934
- La découverte de Dieu, Paris, Aubier, 1955
- Traité de morale générale, Paris, Puf, 1942
- Le devoir, Paris, Alcan, 1930
- Traité de caractérologie, Paris, Puf, 1945
- Introduction à la philosophie, Paris, Puf, 1949
- Le mensonge et le caractère, Paris, F. Alcan, 1930
- La destinée personnelle, Paris, Flammarion, Bibliothèque de philosophie scientifique, 1951

Articles

- La découverte de Dieu, recueil d'articles posthumes, 1955
- Le devoir comme principe de toute valeur, Bulletin de la Société française de philosophie, 1932
- Qu'est-ce que la valeur ?, Bulletin de la Société française de philosophie 1946.

English translations

- Obstacle and Value, Northwestern University Studies in Phenomenology & Existential Philosophy, 1972

== Honors and Awards ==
Officer of the Order of Legion of Honour
