= Étienne Bonnot de Condillac =

French philosopher (1714–1780)

The Reverend Étienne Bonnot de Condillac
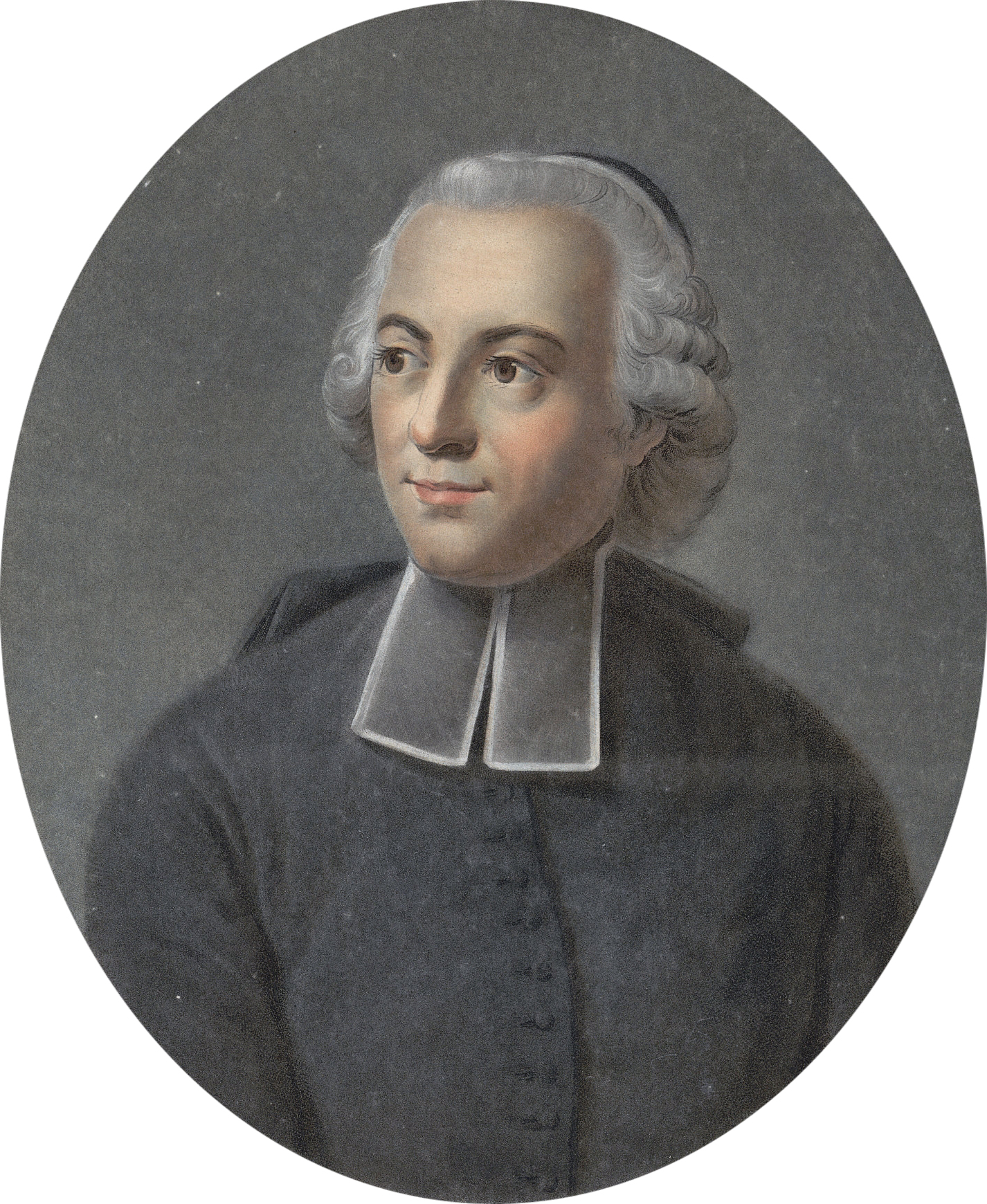
- Etienne Bonnot de Condillac
- Born: 30 September 1714; Grenoble, Kingdom of France
- Died: 2 August 1780 (aged 65); Lailly-en-Val, Kingdom of France

Philosophical work
- Era: Modern philosophy: Enlightenment philosophy
- Region: Western philosophy: French philosophy
- School: Empiricism
- Main interests: Psychology, philosophy of mind, epistemology
- Notable ideas: Sensationalism

Étienne Bonnot de Condillac (/kɒ̃dɪˈjæk/ KON-ih-yak; French: [etjɛn bɔno də kɔ̃dijak]; 30 September 1714 – 2 August or 3 August 1780) was a French philosopher and Catholic priest who focused on psychology and the philosophy of the mind.

== Biography ==
He was born at Grenoble into a legal family, the youngest of three brothers. His two older brothers Jean and Gabriel took names associated with one of the family's properties at Mably, Loire, and were each known as "Bonnot de Mably". Étienne identified with another property at Condillac, Drôme, was known as "Bonnot de Condillac". Like his brother Gabriel, Condillac took holy orders (1733–1740) at Saint-Sulpice church in Paris. He was appointed as Abbot of Mureau.

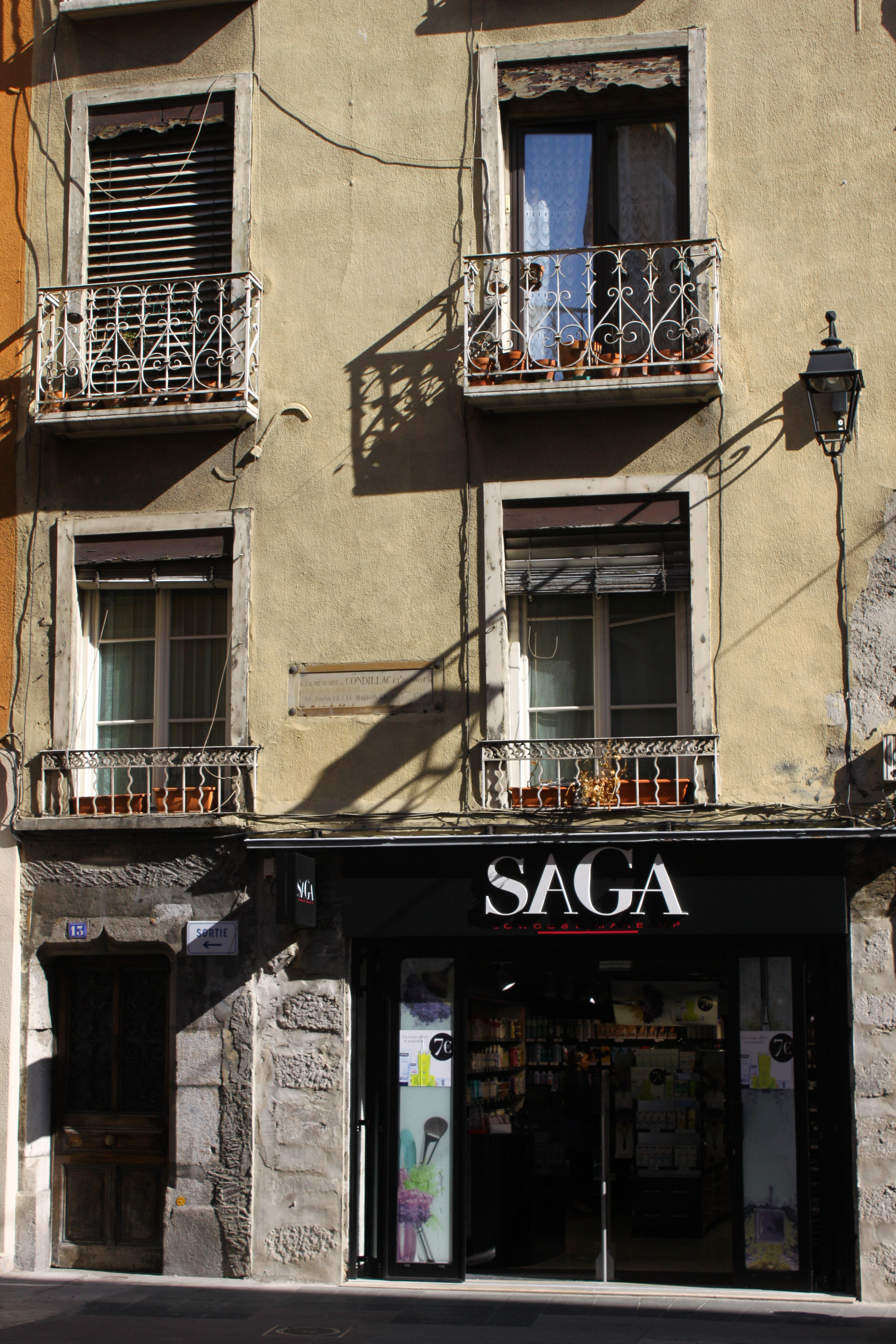
Birthplace of de Condillac in 13 Grande Rue à Grenoble

Condillac devoted his whole life, with the exception of an interval as a court-appointed tutor to the court of Parma, to speculative thought. His works are:

- Essai sur l'origine des connaissances humaines (1746);
- Traité des systèmes (1749);
- Traité des sensations (1754);
- Traité des animaux (1755);
- a comprehensive Cours d'études (1767–1773) in 13 vols., written for the young Duke Ferdinand of Parma, a grandson of Louis XV;
- Le Commerce et le gouvernement, considérés relativement l'un a l'autre (1776); and two posthumous works,
- Logique (1781) and the unfinished Langue des calculs (1798).

In Paris, Condillac was involved with the circle of Denis Diderot, the philosopher who was co-contributor to the Encyclopédie. He developed a friendship with Jean-Jacques Rousseau, which lasted in some measure to the end of his life. It likely started when Rousseau was a tutor to two of his brother Jean's sons in Lyon—Jean Bonnot de Mably was then provost of the police and known as Monsieur de Mably.

Condillac's relations with unorthodox philosophers did not injure his career. He had already published several works when the French court sent him to Parma to educate the orphan duke, then a child of seven years.

On his return from Italy, Condillac was elected to the Académie française in 1768. Contrary to the popular idea that he attended only one meeting, he was a frequent attendee until two years before his death. He spent his later years in retirement at Flux, a small property which he had purchased near Beaugency on the river Loire. He died there on 2 or 3 August 1780.

== Work ==
Condillac is important both as a psychologist and as having established systematically in France the principles of John Locke. Voltaire had made the English philosopher fashionable. Condillac developed his concept of sensationalism, and demonstrated "lucidity, brevity, moderation, and an earnest striving after logical method."

His first book, the Essai sur l'origine des connaissances humaines, keeps close to his English master. He accepts with some reluctance Locke's deduction of our knowledge from two sources, sensation and reflection. He uses as his main principle of explanation the association of ideas.

His next book, the Traité des systèmes, is a vigorous criticism of those modern systems which are based upon abstract principles or upon unsound hypotheses. His polemic, which is inspired throughout by Locke, is directed against the innate ideas of the Cartesians, Malebranche's faculty-psychology, Leibniz's monadism and pre-established harmony, and, above all, against the conception of substance set forth in the first part of the Ethics of Baruch Spinoza.

By far the most important of his works is the Traité des sensations, in which Condillac treats psychology in his own characteristic way. He questioned Locke's doctrine that the senses give us intuitive knowledge of objects, that the eye, for example, naturally judges shapes, sizes, positions, and distances. He believed it was necessary to study the senses separately, to distinguish precisely what ideas are owed to each sense, to observe how the senses are trained, and how one sense aids another. He believed that the necessary conclusion is that sensation is the sole source of human knowledge and that all human faculties derive from it as simply transformed sensations, to the exclusion of other principles such as reflection.

The author imagines a statue organized inwardly like a man, animated by a soul which has never received an idea, into which no sense-impression has ever penetrated. He unlocks its senses one by one, beginning with smell, as the sense that contributes least to human knowledge. At its first experience of smell, the consciousness of the statue is entirely occupied by it; and this occupancy of consciousness is attention. The statue's smell-experience will produce pleasure or pain; and pleasure and pain will thenceforward be the master-principle which, determining all the operations of its mind, will raise it by degrees to all the knowledge of which it is capable. The next stage is memory, which is the lingering impression of the smell experience upon the attention: "memory is nothing more than a mode of feeling." From memory springs comparison: the statue experiences the smell, say, of a rose, while remembering that of a carnation; and "comparison is nothing more than giving one's attention to two things simultaneously." And "as soon as the statue has comparison it has judgment." Comparisons and judgments become habitual, are stored in the mind and formed into series, and thus arises the powerful principle of the association of ideas. From comparison of past and present experiences in respect of their pleasure-giving quality arises desire; it is desire that determines the operation of our faculties, stimulates the memory and imagination, and gives rise to the passions. The passions, also, are nothing but sensation transformed.

These indications will suffice to show the general course of the argument in the first section of the Traité des sensations. He thoroughly developed this idea through the subsequent chapters: "Of the Ideas of a Man limited to the Sense of Smell," "Of a Man limited to the Sense of Hearing," "Of Smell and Hearing combined," "Of Taste by itself, and of Taste combined with Smell and Hearing," "Of a Man limited to the Sense of Sight."

In the second section of the treatise, Condillac invests his statue with the sense of touch, which first informs it of the existence of external objects. In a very careful and elaborate analysis, he distinguishes the various elements in our tactile experiences-the touching of one's own body, the touching of objects other than one's own body, the experience of movement, the exploration of surfaces by the hands: he traces the growth of the statue's perceptions of extension, distance and shape. The third section deals with the combination of touch with the other senses. The fourth section deals with the desires, activities and ideas of an isolated man who enjoys possession of all the senses; and ends with observations on a "wild boy" who was found living among bears in the forests of Lithuania.

The conclusion of the whole work is that in the natural order of things, everything has its source in sensation, and yet that this source is not equally abundant in all men; men differ greatly in the degree of vividness with which they feel. Finally, he says that man is nothing but what he has acquired; all innate faculties and ideas are to be swept away. Modern theories of evolution and heredity have differed from this.

Condillac's work on politics and history, in his Cours d'études, is considered of less interest. In logic, on which he wrote extensively, he is far less successful than in psychology. He enlarges with much iteration on the supremacy of the analytic method; argues that reasoning consists in the substitution of one proposition for another which is identical with it; and lays it down that science is the same thing as a well-constructed language, a proposition which in his Langue des calculs, he tries to prove by the example of arithmetic. His logic is limited by his study of sensations and lack of knowledge of science other than mathematics. He rejects the medieval apparatus of the syllogism; but is precluded by his standpoint from understanding the active, spiritual character of thought; nor had he that interest in natural science and appreciation of inductive reasoning which form the chief merit of J. S. Mill. Some might claim that Condillac's anti-spiritual psychology, with its explanation of personality as an aggregate of sensations, leads straight to atheism and determinism. However, he denies both these consequences. What he says upon religion is always in harmony with his profession; and he vindicated the freedom of the will in a dissertation that has very little in common with the Traité des sensations to which it is appended. The common reproach of materialism should certainly not be made against him. He always asserts the substantive reality of the soul; and in the opening words of his Essai, "Whether we rise to heaven, or descend to the abyss, we never get outside ourselves—it is always our own thoughts that we perceive," we have the subjectivist principle that forms the starting-point of Berkeley.

== Language ==
Condillac promoted "sensationalism," a theory that says all knowledge comes from the senses and there are no innate ideas. Condillac promoted an expressionist theory of linguistic creation that anticipates the prime features of later thoughts about language by German theorist Johann Gottfried Herder (1744–1803).

== Economics ==
Condillac's Le Commerce et le Gouvernement (published in 1776, the same year as Adam Smith's Wealth of Nations) attempted to place economics in a coherent logical framework. He was a friend of François Quesnay – leader of the Physiocrats. Much of Condillac's work reflected mainstream Physiocrats, particularly his analysis of the structure of taxation and proposals for the revival of the economy, but he also proposed another line of argument, claiming that producers work to obtain utility. Most physiocrats rejected utility and the idea was ignored until his 'rediscovery' by Stanley Jevons and Carl Menger in 1871.

In his theory of "vrai prix" [true price], Condillac proposed a theory of human history divided into two phases: progress and decline. Progress is marked by a rational development and use of resources; decline is precipitated by bad behavior from the upper classes that then trickles down to the workers, encouraging excess, luxury, and false prices that harm the masses. Condillac saw the remedy to this as "vrai prix," a true price created by the unimpeded interaction of supply and demand, to be achieved by complete deregulation. People would be taught to work toward their best interest in an open market through a reshaping of their perceptions. By advocating of a free market economy in contrast to the prevailing contemporary policy of state control in France, Condillac influenced classical liberal economics.

== Legacy ==
As was fitting to a disciple of Locke, Condillac's ideas had important effects upon English thought. In matters connected with the association of ideas, the supremacy of pleasure and pain, and the general explanation of all mental contents as sensations or transformed sensations, his influence can be traced upon the Mills and upon Bain and Herbert Spencer. And, apart from any definite propositions, Condillac did a notable work in the direction of making psychology a science.

His method, however, of imaginative reconstruction was by no means suited to English ways of thinking. In spite of his protests against abstraction, hypothesis and synthesis, his allegory of the statue is in the highest degree abstract, hypothetical and synthetic. James Mill, who stood more by the study of concrete realities, put Condillac into the hands of his youthful son with the warning that here was an example of what to avoid in the method of psychology. A modern historian has compared Condillac with Scottish Enlightenment philosopher and pre-evolutionary thinker Lord Monboddo, who had a similar fascination with abstraction and ideas. In France Condillac's doctrine, so congenial to the tone of 18th century philosophism, reigned in the schools for over fifty years, challenged only by a few who, like Maine de Biran, saw that it gave no sufficient account of volitional experience. Early in the 19th century, the romantic awakening of Germany had spread to France, and sensationism was displaced by the eclectic spiritualism of Victor Cousin.

Condillac's collected works were published in 1798 (23 vols.) and two or three times subsequently; the last edition (1822) has an introductory dissertation by A. F. Théry. The Encyclopédie méthodique has a very long article on Condillac by Naigeon. Biographical details and criticism of the Traité des systèmes in J. P. Damiron's Mémoires pour servir a l'histoire de to philosophie au dixhuitieme siècle, tome iii.; a full criticism in V Cousin's Cours de l'histoire de la philosophie moderne, ser. i. tome iii. Consult also F Rethoré, Condillac ou l'empirisme et le rationalisme (1864); L Dewaule, Condillac et la psychologie anglaise contemporaine (1891); histories of philosophy.

In Condillac's statue, a chapter in A Mind So Rare: The evolution of human consciousness, psychologist and cognitive neuroscientist Merlin Donald argues that Condillac was the first constructivist.

In the short story "Condillac's Statue, or Wrens in his Head", science fiction writer R. A. Lafferty brings the allegory of Condillac's statue to life, having Condillac build the statue in a park in the French countryside, and then slowly turning the statue's senses on one at a time.

== Works ==
- M. l'Abbé de Condillac (1786). Le commerce et le gouvernement considérés relativement l'un à l'autre (in French). Amsterdam: Jombert & Cellot.
- M. l'Abbé de Condillac (1780). La logique, ou Les premiers développements de l'art de penser (in French). Paris.
- Condillac (1947–1951). Le Roy, Georges (ed.). Œuvres philosophiques de Condillac. Paris: Presses Universitaires de France.
- Etienne Bonnot, Abbé de Condillac (1987). Philosophical Writings of Etienne Bonnot, Abbé de Condillac. Hillsdale College: Lawrence Erlbaum.
