= Maurice Blanchot =

French writer (1907–2003)

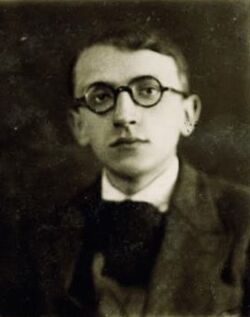
- Blanchot in 1927
- Born: 22 September 1907; Devrouze, Saône-et-Loire, France
- Died: 20 February 2003 (aged 95); Le Mesnil-Saint-Denis, France

Education
- Education: University of Strasbourg (B.A., 1922); University of Paris (M.A., 1930)
- Academic advisor: Maurice Pradines

Philosophical work
- Era: 20th-century philosophy
- Region: Western philosophy
- School: Continental philosophy Phenomenology; French Nietzscheanism
- Main interests: Ethics; poetics; philosophy of death; philosophy of language; literary criticism; political philosophy; aesthetics
- Notable ideas: The neutral (le neutre); Right to death Two kinds of death (Note: Blanchot's premise is that the first death is the actual event, happening in its own history; the second death is the virtual form of the event, which does not tangibly "happen".)

Maurice Blanchot (/blɒnˈʃoʊ/ blon-SHOH; French: [blɑ̃ʃo]; 22 September 1907 – 20 February 2003) was a French writer, philosopher and literary theorist. His work, exploring a philosophy of death alongside poetic theories of meaning and sense, bore significant influence on post-structuralist philosophers such as Gilles Deleuze, Michel Foucault, Jacques Derrida and Jean-Luc Nancy.

== Biography ==
=== Pre-1945 ===
Blanchot was born in the village of Quain (Saône-et-Loire) on 22 September 1907.

Blanchot studied philosophy from 1926 at the University of Strasbourg, where he represented monarchist views, was a committee member of a student association modelled on the German Burschenschaften, and became a close lifelong friend of the Lithuanian-born French Jewish phenomenologist Emmanuel Levinas. On his friend's recommendation, he read Martin Heidegger's newly published Being and Time and described it as an "intellectual shock". In 1930 he earned his DES (diplôme d'études supérieures), roughly equivalent to an M.A. at the University of Paris, with a thesis titled "La Conception du dogmatisme chez les sceptiques anciens d'après Sextus Empiricus" ("The Conception of Dogmatism in the Ancient Sceptics According to Sextus Empiricus").

He then embarked on a career as a political journalist in Paris. From 1932 to 1940 he was editor of the mainstream conservative daily Journal des débats. Early in the 1930s he contributed to a series of radical nationalist magazines while also serving as editor of the fiercely anti-German daily Le rempart in 1933 and as editor of Paul Lévy's anti-Nazi polemical weekly Aux écoutes. In 1936 and 1937 he also contributed to the far right monthly Combat and to the nationalist-syndicalist daily L'Insurgé, which eventually ceased publication – largely as a result of Blanchot's intervention – because of the anti-semitism of some of its contributors. There is no dispute that Blanchot was nevertheless the author of a series of violently polemical articles attacking the government of the day and its confidence in the politics of the League of Nations, and warned persistently against the threat to peace in Europe posed by Nazi Germany.

In December 1940, he met Georges Bataille, who had written strong anti-fascist articles in the thirties, and who would remain a close friend until his death in 1962. Blanchot worked in Paris during the Nazi occupation. In order to support his family he continued to work as a book reviewer for the Journal des débats from 1941 to 1944, writing for instance about such figures as Sartre and Camus, Bataille and Michaux, Mallarmé and Duras for a putatively Pétainist Vichy readership. In these reviews he laid the foundations for later French critical thinking by examining the ambiguous rhetorical nature of language and the irreducibility of the written word to notions of truth or falsity. He refused the editorship of the collaborationist Nouvelle Revue Française for which, as part of an elaborate ploy, he had been suggested by Jean Paulhan. He was active in the Resistance and remained a bitter opponent of the fascist, anti-semitic novelist and journalist Robert Brasillach, who was the principal leader of the pro-Nazi collaborationist movement. In June 1944, Blanchot was almost executed by a Nazi firing squad (as recounted in his text The Instant of My Death).

=== Post-1945 ===
After the war, Blanchot began working only as a novelist and literary critic. In 1947, Blanchot left Paris for the secluded village of Èze in the south of France, where he spent the next decade of his life. Like Sartre and other French intellectuals of the era, Blanchot avoided the academy as a means of livelihood, instead relying on his pen. Importantly, from 1953 to 1968, he published regularly in Nouvelle Revue Française. At the same time, he began a lifestyle of relative isolation, often not seeing close friends (like Emmanuel Levinas) for years, while continuing to write lengthy letters to them. Part of the reason for his self-imposed isolation (and only part of it – his isolation was closely connected to his writing and is often featured among his characters) was that, for most of his life, Blanchot suffered from poor health.

Blanchot's political activities after the war shifted to the left. He is widely credited with being one of the main authors of the important "Manifesto of the 121", named after the number of its signatories, who included Jean-Paul Sartre, Robert Antelme, Alain Robbe-Grillet, Marguerite Duras, René Char, Henri Lefebvre, Alain Resnais, Simone Signoret and others, which supported the rights of conscripts to refuse to serve in the colonial war in Algeria. The manifesto was crucial to the intellectual response to the war.

In May 1968, Blanchot once again emerged from personal obscurity, in support of the student protests. It was his sole public appearance after the war. Yet for fifty years he remained a consistent champion of modern literature and its tradition in French letters. During the later years of his life, he repeatedly wrote against the intellectual attraction to fascism, and notably against Heidegger's post-war silence over The Holocaust.

Blanchot wrote more than thirty works of fiction, literary criticism, and philosophy. Up to the 1970s, he worked continually in his writing to break the barriers between what are generally perceived as different "genres" or "tendencies", and much of his later work moves freely between narration and philosophical investigation.

In 1983, Blanchot published La Communauté inavouable (The Unavowable Community). This work inspired The Inoperative Community (1986), Jean-Luc Nancy's attempt to approach community in a non-religious, non-utilitarian and un-political exegesis.

He died on 20 February 2003 in Le Mesnil-Saint-Denis, Yvelines, France.

== Work ==
Blanchot's work explores a philosophy of death, not in humanistic terms, but through concerns of paradox, impossibility, nonsense and the noumenal that stem from the conceptual impossibility of death. He constantly engaged with the "question of literature", a simultaneous enactment and interrogation of the idiosyncratic act of writing. For Blanchot, "literature begins at the moment when literature becomes a question".

Blanchot drew on the poetics of Stéphane Mallarmé and Paul Celan, as well as the concept of negation in the Hegelian dialectic, for his theory of literary language as something that is always anti-realist and so distinct from everyday experience that realism does not simply stand for literature about reality, but for literature concerning paradoxes made by the qualities of the act of writing. Blanchot's literary theory parallels Hegel's philosophy, establishing that actual reality always succeeds conceptual reality. For instance, "I say flower," Mallarmé wrote in "Poetry in Crisis", "and outside the oblivion to which my voice relegates any shape, [...] there arises [...] the one absent from every bouquet."

What the everyday use of language steps over or negates is the physical reality of the thing for the sake of the abstract concept. Literature – through its use of symbolism and metaphor – frees language from this utilitarianism, thereby drawing attention to the fact that language refers not to the physical thing, but only to an idea of it. Literature, Blanchot writes, remains fascinated by this presence of absence, and attention is drawn, through the sonority and rhythm of words, to the materiality of language.

Blanchot's best-known fictional works are Thomas l'Obscur (Thomas the Obscure), an unsettling récit (which "is not the narration of an event, but that event itself, the approach to that event, the place where that event is made to happen ...") about the experience of reading and loss, Death Sentence, Aminadab, and The Most High. His central theoretical works are "Literature and the Right to Death" (in The Work of Fire and The Gaze of Orpheus), The Space of Literature, The Infinite Conversation, and The Writing of the Disaster.

Many of Blanchot's principal translators into English have since established reputations as prose stylists and poets in their own right; some of the more well-known of them include Lydia Davis, Paul Auster and Pierre Joris.

=== Themes ===
Blanchot engages with Heidegger on the question of how literature and death are both experienced as an anonymous passivity, an experience that Blanchot variously refers to as "the neutral" (le neutre). Unlike Heidegger, Blanchot instead rejects the possibility of an authentic relation to death, because he rejects the conceptual possibility of death. In a manner similar to Levinas, who Blanchot later became influenced by with regards to the question of responsibility to the Other, he reverses Heidegger's position on death as the "possibility of the absolute impossibility" of Dasein, instead viewing death as the "impossibility of every possibility".

== Selected bibliography ==
=== Fiction and narrations (récits) ===
- Thomas l'Obscur (1941; revised 1950). Thomas the Obscure, trans. Robert Lamberton (David Lewis, 1973; Station Hill Press, 1995)
- Aminadab (1942). Aminadab, trans. Jeff Fort (University of Nebraska Press, 2002)
- L'Arrêt de mort (1948). Death Sentence, trans. Lydia Davis (Station Hill Press, 1978)
- Le Très-Haut (1949). The Most High, trans. Allan Stoekl (University of Nebraska Press, 1996)
- Au moment voulu (1951). When the Time Comes, trans. Lydia Davis (Station Hill Press, 1985)
- Le Ressassement éternel (1951). Vicious Circles
- Celui qui ne m'accompagnait pas (1953). The One Who Was Standing Apart from Me, trans. Lydia Davis (Station Hill Press, 1992)
- Le Dernier homme (1957). The Last Man, trans. Lydia Davis (Columbia University Press, 1987)
- L'Attente l'oubli (1962). Awaiting Oblivion, trans. John Gregg (University of Nebraska Press, 1997)
- La Folie du jour (1973). The Madness of the Day, trans. Lydia Davis (Station Hill Press, 1981)
- Après Coup, preceded by Le Ressassement éternel (1983). Vicious Circles: Two Fictions & "After the Fact", trans. Paul Auster (Station Hill Press, 1985)
- L'Instant de ma mort (1994). The Instant of My Death, trans. Elizabeth Rottenberg (Stanford University Press, 2000)

=== Philosophical or theoretical works ===
- Faux Pas (1943). Faux Pas, trans. Charlotte Mandell (Stanford University Press, 2001)
- La Part du feu (1949). The Work of Fire, trans. Charlotte Mandell (Stanford University Press, 1995)
- Lautréamont et Sade (1949). Lautréamont and Sade, trans. Stuart Kendall and Michelle Kendall (Stanford University Press, 2004)
- L'Espace littéraire (1955). The Space of Literature, trans. Ann Smock (University of Nebraska Press, 1982)
- Le Livre à venir (1959). The Book to Come, trans. Charlotte Mandell (Stanford University Press, 2003)
- L'Entretien infini (1969). The Infinite Conversation, trans. Susan Hanson (University of Minnesota Press, 1993)
- L'Amitié (1971). Friendship, trans. Elizabeth Rottenberg (Stanford University Press, 1997)
- Le Pas au-delà (1973). The Step Not Beyond, trans. Lycette Nelson (State University of New York Press, 1992)
- L'Ecriture du désastre (1980). The Writing of the Disaster, trans. Ann Smock (University of Nebraska Press, 1986)
- La Communauté inavouable (1983). The Unavowable Community, trans. Pierre Joris (Station Hill Press, 1988)
- Une voix venue d'ailleurs (2002). A Voice from Elsewhere, trans. Charlotte Mandell (State University of New York Press, 2007)

=== Articles and essays ===
- Chroniques littéraires du « Journal des Débats », avril 1941-août 1944 (2008)
  - Into Disaster: Chronicles of Intellectual Life, 1941, trans. Michael Holland (Fordham University Press, 2014)
  - Desperate Clarity: Chronicles of Intellectual Life, 1942, trans. Michael Holland (Fordham University Press, 2014)
  - A World in Ruins: Chronicles of Intellectual Life, 1943, trans. Michael Holland (Fordham University Press, 2016)
  - Death Now: Chronicles of Intellectual Life, 1944, trans. Michael Holland (Fordham University Press, 2019)

=== Compilations in English ===
- The Gaze of Orpheus and Other Literary Essays, ed. P. Adams Sitney, trans. Lydia Davis (Station Hill Press, 1981)
- The Sirens' Song: Selected Essays, ed. Gabriel Josipovici (Indiana University Press, 1982)
- The Blanchot Reader, ed. Michael Holland (Blackwell, 1995)
- The Station Hill Blanchot Reader, ed. George Quasha (Station Hill Press, 1999)
- Political Writings, 1953-1993, ed. Zakir Paul (Fordham University Press, 2010)
