= Spiritualism (philosophy) =

Philosophical belief in immaterial reality

In philosophy, spiritualism (Note: Also neo-spiritualism, spiritual realism or French idealism in the context of late modern French philosophy.) is the concept, shared by a wide variety of systems of thought, that there is an immaterial reality that cannot be perceived by the senses. This includes philosophies that postulate a personal God, the immortality of the soul, or the immortality of the intellect or will, as well as any systems of thought that assume a universal mind or cosmic forces lying beyond the reach of purely materialistic interpretations.

Generally, any philosophical position, be it dualism, monism, atheism, theism, pantheism, idealism or any other, is compatible with spiritualism as long as it allows for a reality beyond matter. Theism is an example of a dualist spiritualist philosophy, while pantheism is an example of monist spiritualism.

As a philosophical tradition, spiritualism was especially associated with 19th- and early 20th-century French thought. French spiritualism emphasised the metaphysical and ethical primacy of the individual mind, opposing both materialist and empiricist reductions of mental life and forms of idealism that subordinated the individual to an absolute spirit.

== Notable spiritualist thinkers ==
- Aristotle
- F. H. Bradley
- Giovanni Gentile
- William Ernest Hocking
- Gottfried Wilhelm Leibniz
- Pindar
- Plato
- Josiah Royce

French spiritualists

- Henri Bergson
- Maine de Biran
- Maurice Blondel
- Émile Boutroux
- Léon Brunschvicg
- Elme Marie Caro
- Jacques Chevalier
- Victor Cousin
- René Descartes
- Alfred Fouillée
- Alphonse Gratry
- Paul Janet
- Théodore Jouffroy
- Jules Lachelier
- Louis Lavelle
- Jules Lequier
- René Lesenne
- Léon Ollé-Laprune
- Maurice Pradines
- Félix Ravaisson
- Émile Saisset
- Étienne Souriau

== See also ==
- Metaphysics
- Sensualism
- Spiritualism (religious movement)
- Spiritualism (Wallace)

== Sources ==
- Dominique Janicaud, Une Généalogie du spiritualisme français. Aux sources du bergsonisme : Ravaisson et la métaphysique, La Haye, M. Nijhoff, 1969.
