= Maine de Biran =

French philosopher (1766-1824)

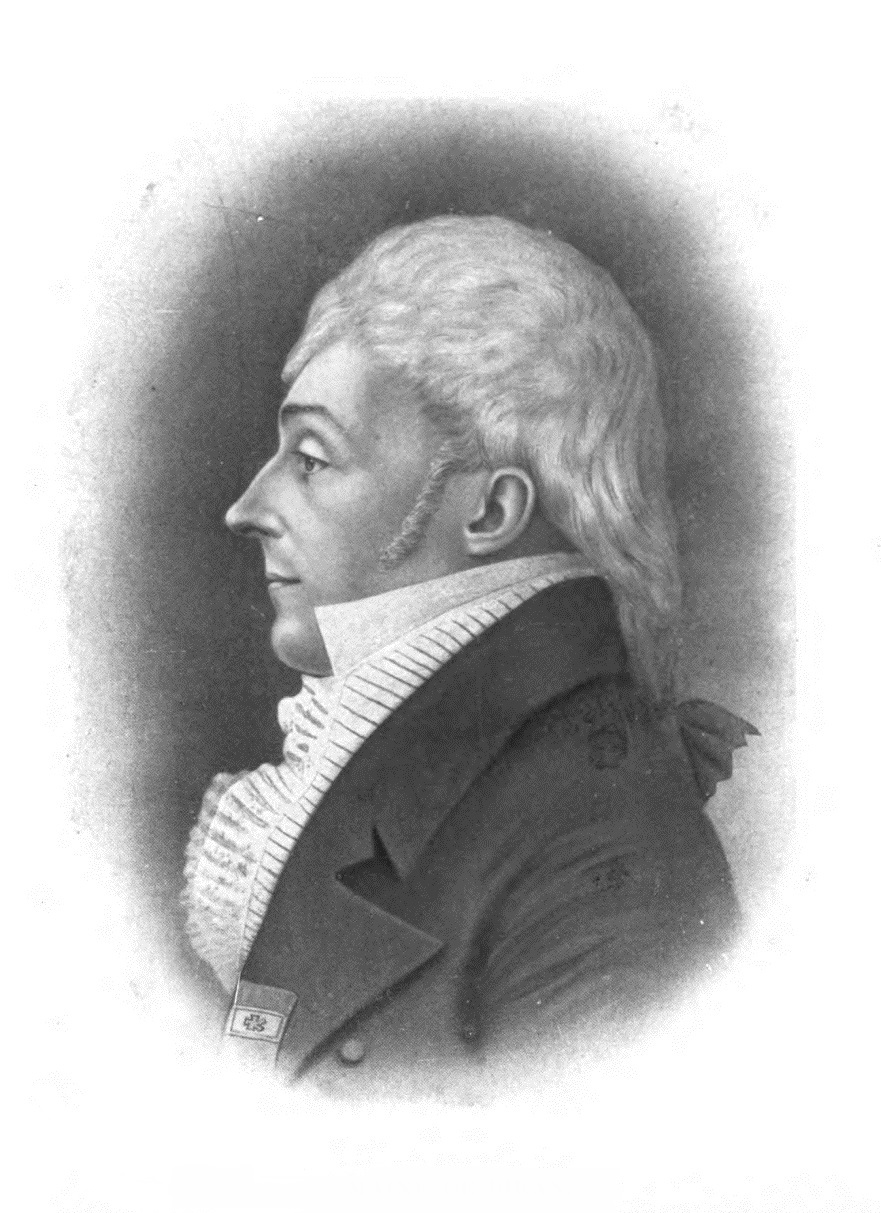
- Born: François-Pierre-Gontier de Biran; 29 November 1766; Grateloup near Bergerac, Périgord, France
- Died: 20 July 1824 (aged 57); Paris, France

Education
- Education: University of Poitiers (LL.B.)

Philosophical work
- Era: Modern philosophy
- Region: Western philosophy
- School: French spiritualism
- Main interests: Metaphysics, psychology of habit
- Notable ideas: The primacy of voluntary effort (volo, ergo sum, "I will, therefore I am")

François-Pierre-Gontier de Biran (/bɪˈrɑːn/; 29 November 1766 – 20 July 1824), better known as Maine de Biran (French: [mɛn də biʁɑ̃]), was a French philosopher.

== Life ==
François-Pierre-Gontier de Biran was born in Bergerac. He assumed the name Maine (sometime before 1787) from his father's estate called Le Maine, near Mouleydier. After studying with distinction at Périgueux, he entered the life guards of King Louis XVI, and was present at Versailles during the events of October 1789.

He entered politics and was part of the Conseil des Cinq Cents in April, 1797; however, as he incurred the hostility of the Directory by his royalist sympathies he withdrew to his patrimonial inheritance of Grateloup, near Bergerac, where he avoided the excesses of the French Revolution and where he devoted himself to philosophy. It was at this period that, to use his own words, he "passed per saltum from frivolity to philosophy". He began with psychology, which he made the study of his life.

After the Reign of Terror, Biran took part in politics and was elected to parliament in 1812, 1815, and 1820. Having been excluded from the Council of the Five Hundred on suspicion of royalism, he took part with his friend Joseph Lainé in the commission of 1813, which first expressed direct opposition to the will of the emperor Napoleon. After the restoration of the monarchy, he became treasurer to the Chamber of Deputies, retiring during each autumn recess to study at home.

His constitution was delicate and sensitive and his philosophic bent had already manifested itself by his observations on the influence of the physical state on the moral. As an ideologist he won the prize at the Institut with his essay "Sur l'habitude" (1802); but his "Décomposition de la pensée" (1805) shows him deviating from the theory of that school, and in "La perception immédiate" (1807), and "Rapports du physique et du morale de l'homme" (1811), he is an opponent of the eighteenth-century philosophy. In his latter days his tendency to mysticism gradually brought him back towards practical Christianity, and he died a faithful child of the Catholic Church.

He married twice in 1795 and 1814 and had a son Félix in 1796 and two daughters Eliza 1797 and Adine 1800 who all bore the new surname of Maine de Biran. With his son, Félix, having only daughters, the name "Maine de Biran" died out in 1879 before being taken over at the end of the 19th century by the natural son of a distant niece, Françoise Gontier de Biran known as Nelly, with an unknown man.

== Thought ==
Only a few of Biran's writings appeared during his lifetime: the essay on habit (Influence de l'habitude sur la faculté de penser, "The Influence of Habit on the Faculty of Thinking", 1802), a critical review of Pierre Laromiguière's lectures (1817), and the philosophical portion of the article "Leibnitz" in the Biographie universelle (1819). A treatise on the analysis of thought (Sur la décomposition de la pensée, "On the Decomposition of Thought") was never printed. In 1834 these writings, together with the essay entitled Nouvelles considérations sur les rapports du physique et du moral de l'homme, were published by Victor Cousin, who in 1841 added three volumes, under the title Œuvres philosophiques de Maine de Biran. But the publication (in 1859) by Édouard Naville (from manuscripts placed at his father's disposal by Biran's son) of the Œuvres inédites de Maine de Biran, in three volumes, first rendered possible a connected view of his philosophical development.

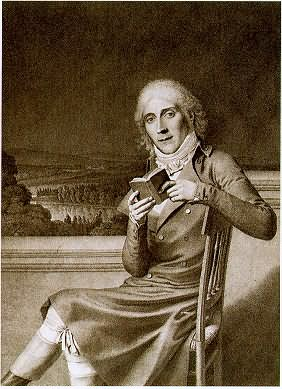
Portrait of Maine de Biran, by Jean Bernard Duvivier, 1798.

At first a sensualist, like Condillac and John Locke, next an intellectualist, he finally became a mystical theosophist. The Essai sur les fondements de la psychologie represents the second stage of his philosophy, the fragments of the Nouveaux essais d'anthropologie the third. Biran's early essays in philosophy were written from the point of view of Locke and Condillac, but showed signs of his later interests. Dealing with the formation of habits, he is compelled to note that passive impressions do not furnish a complete or adequate explanation. With Laromiguière he distinguishes attention as an active effort, of no less importance than the passive receptivity of sense, and like Joseph Butler, he distinguishes passively formed customs from active habits. He concluded that Condillac's notion of passive receptivity as the one source of conscious experience was an error of method – in short, that the mechanical mode of viewing consciousness as formed by external influence was fallacious and deceptive. For it he proposed to substitute the genetic method, whereby human conscious experience might be exhibited as growing or developing from its essential basis in connection with external conditions. The essential basis he finds in the real consciousness, of self as an active striving power, and the stages of its development, corresponding to what one may call the relative importance of the external conditions and the reflective clearness of self-consciousness he designates as the affective, the perceptive and the reflective. In connexion with this Biran treats most of the obscure problems which arise in dealing with conscious experience, such as the mode by which the organism is cognized, the mode by which the organism is distinguished from extra-organic things, and the nature of those general ideas by which the relations of things are known – cause, power, force, etc.

In the last stage of his philosophy, Biran distinguished the animal existence from the human, under which the three forms above noted are classed. And both from the life of the spirit, in which human thought is brought into relation with the supersensible, divine system of things. This stage is left imperfect. Altogether, Biran's work presents a very remarkable specimen of deep metaphysical thinking directed by preference to the psychological aspect of experience.

So, it has been said that there are three stages marking the development of his philosophy. Up to 1804, a stage called by Naville "the philosophy of sensation", he was a follower of Condillac's sensism, as modified by de Tracy, which he soon abandoned in favour of a system based on an analysis of internal reflection. In the second stage – the philosophy of will – 1804–18, to avoid materialism and fatalism, he embraced the doctrine of immediate apperception, showing that man knows himself and exterior things by the resistance to his effort. On reflecting he remarks on the voluntary effort which differentiates his internal from his external experience, thus learning to distinguish between the ego and the non-ego. In the third stage – the philosophy of religion – after 1818, Biran advocated a mystical intuitional psychology. To man's two states of life: representation (common to animals), and volition (volition, sensation, and perception), he adds a third: love or life of union with God, in which the life of Divine grace absorbs representation and volition. Biran's style is laboured, but he is reckoned by Cousin as the greatest French metaphysician from the time of Malebranche. His genius was not fully recognized till after his death, as the essay "Sur l'habitude" (Paris, 1803) was the only book that appeared under his name during his lifetime; but his reputation was firmly established on the publication of his writings, partly by Cousin (Œuvres philosophiques de Maine de Biran, Paris, 1834-41), and partly by Naville (Œuvres inédites de Maine de Biran, Paris, 1859).

== Criticism ==
=== Equating "cause" with "force" ===
Schopenhauer, claimed that "No one has carried this confusion, or rather identification, of natural force with cause so far as Maine de Biran in his Nouvelles considérations des rapports du physique au moral, since this is essential to his philosophy." This confusion of force of nature and cause occurred often throughout the book. "[W]hen he speaks of causes, he hardly ever puts cause alone, but almost always says cause ou force...." Schopenhauer believed that the confusion was intentional. Biran was "conscious of identifying two disparate concepts in order to be able to make use of either of them according to the circumstances." Therefore, he purposely equated cause with force in order "to keep the identification present in the reader’s mind."

== Works ==
- Œuvres de Maine de Biran (edited by Pierre Tisserand, 1920–32)
  - Vol. I.
  - Vol. II.
  - Vol. III.
  - Vol. IV.
  - Vol. V.
  - Vol. VI.
  - Vol. VII.
  - Vol. VIII.
  - Vol. IX.

== See also ==
- Philipp Albert Stapfer
- James Mark Baldwin
- Implicit cognition
