= Adolphe Garnier =

French academic philosopher (1801–1864)

Adolphe Garnier (27 March 1801 – 4 May 1864) was a French academic philosopher, the main disciple and continuator of Théodore Jouffroy.

== Biography ==
Garnier was born in Paris. He studied at the Collège Bourbon, where he had Jouffroy as a teacher and won the first prize in philosophy in the concours général. He later became a lawyer while contributing to several literary and philosophical collections.

In 1827, he published a pamphlet on the death penalty that drew attention to him and brought him back to philosophy. After passing the agrégation in philosophy in 1827, he taught in Versailles, then in the Parisian colleges of Saint Louis (from 1833), Louis-le-Grand (from 1835 to 1838), and Henri-IV (1840–1841) as well as at the École normale supérieure (1834–1835).

On May 25, 1840, Garnier defended his two theses for the Doctorate of Letters at the University of Paris. The first, in French, is a critique of the philosophy of Thomas Reid. The second, in Latin, is a reflection on poetry.

He was appointed assistant professor of philosophy at the University of Paris Faculty of Letters in 1842, then succeeded Jouffroy in the chair of dogmatic philosophy in 1845 in this university. He was elected a member of the Académie des sciences morales et politiques in 1860.

His work on Social Morality was awarded a Montyon Prize in 1850. His Treatise on the Faculties of the Soul, considered his most important work, earned him his second Montyon Prize in 1853 and was hailed by the Revue des Deux Mondes as "the best monument of psychological science of our time". He also contributed to Le Globe.

He died in Jouy-en-Josas and is buried in the Montmartre Cemetery.

== Works ==
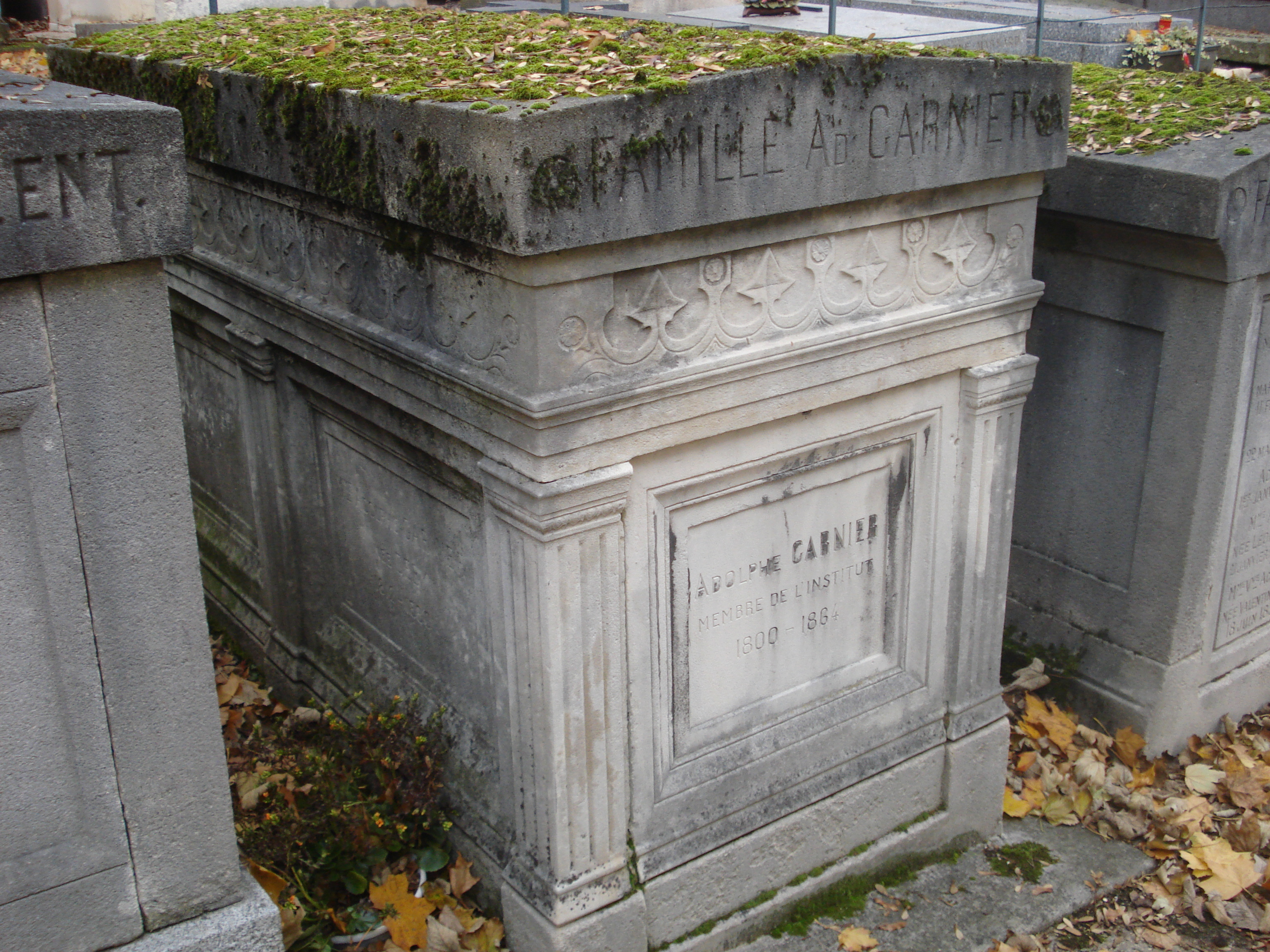
Tomb of Adolphe Garnier at the Montmartre Cemetery

- De la Peine de mort, 1827
- Précis d'un cours de psychologie, 1831. ISBN 978-2-296-01027-7
- Œuvres philosophiques de Descartes, publiées d'après les textes originaux, avec notices, sommaires et éclaircissements, par Adolphe Garnier, 4 vol., 1835
- La Psychologie et la Phrénologie comparées, 1839
- Critique de la philosophie de Thomas Reid, doctoral thesis, 1840
- Quid poesis?, doctoral thesis, 1840
- De la Perception de l'infini et de la foi naturelle, 1846
- Morale sociale, ou Devoirs de l'État et des citoyens en ce qui concerne la propriété, la famille, l'éducation, la liberté, l'égalité, l'organisation du pouvoir, la sûreté intérieure et extérieure, 1850
- Traité des facultés de l'âme, comprenant l'histoire des principales théories psychologiques, 3 vol., 1852.
- Histoire de la morale, 2 vol., 1855–1857
- De la Morale dans l'antiquité, Éd. Germer Baillière, coll. «Bibliothèque de philosophie contemporaine», 1865
