= Théodore Jouffroy =

French philosopher

- Born: Simon Joseph Théodore Jouffroy; 6 July 1796; Les Pontets, Franche-Comté, France
- Died: 4 February 1842 (aged 45); Paris, France

Simon Joseph Théodore Jouffroy (French: [ʒufʁwa]; 6 July 1796 – 4 February 1842) was a French philosopher. He was a proponent of French spiritualism.

== Biography ==
He was born at Les Pontets, Franche-Comté, département of Doubs. In his tenth year, his father, a tax-gatherer, sent him to an uncle at Pontarlier, under whom he began his classical studies. At Dijon his compositions attracted the attention of an inspector, who had him placed (1814) at the École Normale Supérieure, Paris. There he came under the influence of Victor Cousin, and in 1817 he was appointed assistant professor of philosophy at the normal and Bourbon schools.

Three years later, being thrown upon his own resources, he began a course of lectures in his own house, and formed literary connexions with Le Courrier français, Le Globe, L'Encyclopédie moderne, and La Revue européenne. The variety of his pursuits at this time carried him over the whole field of ancient and modern literature. But he was chiefly attracted to the philosophical system represented by Thomas Reid and Dugald Stewart. The application of "common sense" to the problem of substance supplied a more satisfactory analytic for him than the scepticism of David Hume which reached him through a study of Kant.

He thus threw in his lot with the Scottish philosophy, and his first dissertations are adaptations from Reid's Inquiry. In 1826 he wrote a preface to a translation of Stewart's Moral Philosophy, demonstrating the possibility of a scientific statement of the laws of consciousness; in 1828 he began a translation of the works of Reid, and in his preface estimated the influence of Scottish criticism upon philosophy, giving a biographical account of the movement from Francis Hutcheson onwards. In the following year he was returned to parlement by the arrondissement of Pontarlier; but the work of legislation was ill-suited to him. Yet he attended to his duties conscientiously, and ultimately broke his health in their discharge. In 1833 he was appointed professor of Greek and Roman philosophy at the college of France and a member of the Academy of Sciences; he then published the Mélanges philosophiques (4th ed. 1866; Eng. trans. G Ripley, Boston, 1835 and 1838), a collection of fugitive papers in criticism and philosophy and history. In them is foreshadowed all that he afterwards worked out in metaphysics, psychology, ethics and aesthetics.

He had already demonstrated, in his prefaces, the possibility of a psychology apart from physiology, of a science of the phenomena of consciousness distinct from the perceptions of sense. He now classified the mental faculties, premising that they must not be confounded with capacities or properties of mind. They were, according to his analysis, personal will, primitive instincts, voluntary movement, natural and artificial signs, sensibility and the faculties of intellect; on this analytic he founded his scheme of the universe.

In 1835 he published Cours de droit naturel (4th ed. 1866), one of his most important works. From the conception of a universal order in the universe he reasons to a Supreme Being, who has created it and who has conferred upon every man in harmony with it the aim of his existence, leading to his highest good. Good, he says, is the fulfilment of man's destiny, evil the thwarting of it. Every man being organized in a particular way has, of necessity, an aim, the fulfilment of which is good; and he has faculties for accomplishing it, directed by reason. The aim is good, however, only when reason guides it for the benefit of the majority, but that is not absolute good. When reason rises to the conception of universal order, when actions are submitted, by the exercise of a sympathy working necessarily and intuitively to the idea of the universal order, the good has been reached, the true good, good in itself, absolute good. But he does not follow his idea into the details of human duty, though he passes in review fatalism, mysticism, pantheism, scepticism, egotism, sentimentalism and rationalism.

In 1835 Jouffroy's health failed and he went to Italy, where he continued to translate the Scottish philosophers. On his return he became librarian to the university, and took the chair of recent philosophy at the faculty of letters. He died in Paris in 1842.

Jouffroy's claim to distinction rests mainly on his ability as an expositor of other men's ideas. His enthusiasm, and his command over the language of popular exposition, made him a great international medium for the transfusion of ideas. He stood between Scotland and France and Germany and France; and, though his expositions are vitiated by loose reading of the philosophers he interpreted, he did some memorable work.

Adolphe Garnier was the continuator of Jouffroy's work.

== Works ==
- Esquisses de Philosophie Morale. 1826. OCLC 422237300.
- Introduction to Ethics Including a Critical Survey of Moral Systems. Vol. 1. 1848. OCLC 515416140.
- Introduction to Ethics Including a Critical Survey of Moral Systems. Vol. 2. 1848. OCLC 515415726.
- Mélanges Philosophiques. 1860. OCLC 2183553.
- Jouffroy, Théodore (1842). Nouveaux Mélanges Philosophiques. OCLC 568402.
- Cours de droit naturel. 1866.
- Royer-Collard, Paul, 1763-1843; Stewart, Dugald, 1753-1828; Jouffroy, Théodore, 1796-1842 (1828–1836). Œuvres Complètes De Thomas Reid, Chef De L'école Écossaise, Publiées Par M. Th. Jouffroy, Avec Des Fragments De M. Royer-Collard Et Une Introduction De L'éditeur. OCLC 2943985.

His Nouveaux mélanges philosophiques (3rd ed. 1872) and Cours d'esthetique (3rd ed. 1875) were published after his death. According to the Encyclopedia Britannica, his Nouveaux mélanges philosophiques "contributed nothing new to the system except a more emphatic statement of the distinction between psychology and physiology". The Cours d'esthetique "formulated his theory of beauty".
