= Les Pontets =

- Commune
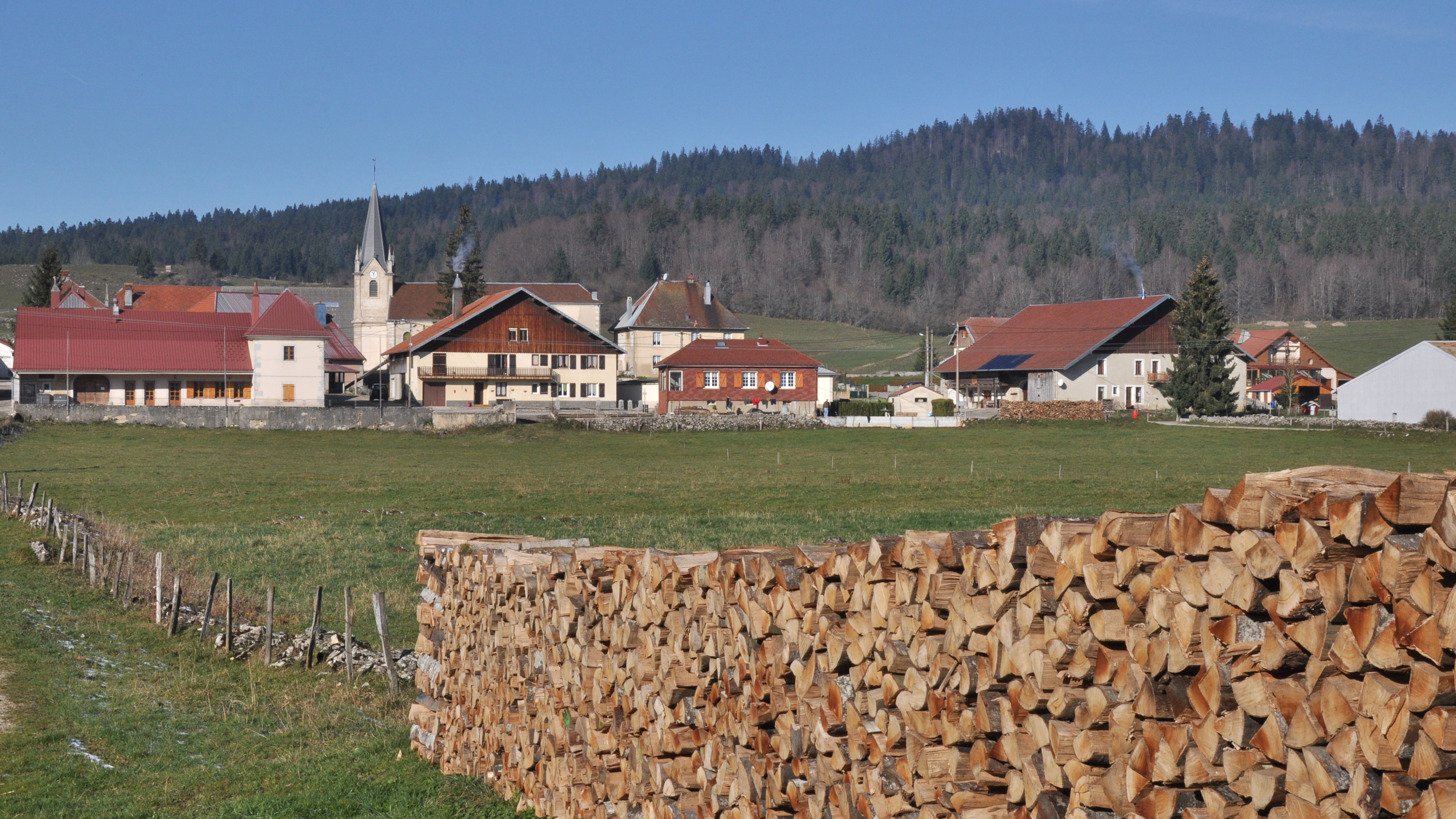
- A general view of Les Pontets
- Location of Les Pontets
- Location within France Location within Bourgogne-Franche-Comté
- Coordinates: 46°43′11″N 6°10′20″E
- Country: France
- Region: Bourgogne-Franche-Comté
- Department: Doubs
- Arrondissement: Pontarlier
- Canton: Frasne
- Intercommunality: Lacs et Montagnes du Haut-Doubs

Government
  - Mayor (2020–2026): Claude Gindre
- Area^{1}: 6.36 km^{2} (2.46 sq mi)
- Highest elevation: 1,237 m (4,058 ft)
- Lowest elevation: 970 m (3,180 ft)
- Population (2023): 141
  - Density: 22.2/km^{2} (57.4/sq mi)
- Time zone: UTC+01:00 (CET)
  - Summer (DST): UTC+02:00 (CEST)
- INSEE/Postal code: 25464 /25240
- ^{1} French Land Register data, which excludes lakes, ponds, glaciers > 1 km^{2} (0.386 sq mi or 247 acres) and river estuaries.

Les Pontets (French pronunciation: [le pɔ̃tɛ]) is a commune in the Doubs department in the Bourgogne-Franche-Comté region in eastern France.

== Geography ==
The commune lies 3 km (1.9 mi) northeast of Mouthe in the valley of Combes Derniers. It is dominated by the Haute Joux, with the peaks of Turchet (1227 m) and Saint Sorlin (1237 m), from which there is a view of the Alps.

== Population ==
Historical population
Year	Pop.	±% p.a.
1968	100	—
1975	73	−4.40%
1982	69	−0.80%
1990	65	−0.74%
1999	84	+2.89%
2007	102	+2.46%
2012	132	+5.29%
2017	135	+0.45%
2023	141	+0.73%
Source: INSEE

== See also ==
- Communes of the Doubs department
