= Maurice Pradines =

French philosopher (1874–1958)

Maurice Pradines (French: [pʁadin]; 28 March 1874, Glovelier – 26 March 1958, Paris) was a Swiss-born French philosopher. He may be categorized among the interwar period philosophers of the mind and was a proponent of French spiritualism. He developed a theory of knowledge in light of the problems of sensation.

He studied at the École Normale Supérieure. His students at the University of Strasbourg included Maurice Blanchot and Emmanuel Levinas.

== Thought ==
In the work of Pradines, the problem of sensation is brought back to that of the union of soul and body. A number of classic authors (including René Descartes and Nicolas Malebranche) considered their separation theoretically. Pradines posed the inverse thesis: that of the immanence of the mind to the body. Any primary or developed psychic phenomenon above all belongs to a living being. How could it be, then, that the body could proceed from the mind? Pradines endeavored to show that in order to explain this relationship, it is necessary to constitute a history or a genesis of the life of the mind.

If the mind is something living, then this question must be answered: what is life? Pradines distinguished two modalities of life: laborious life and defensive life. They are characterized by their respective movements:

- The movement of involution is defined by a living thing's tendency to preserve itself. The living thing perdures by organizing itself. On the one hand, it is capable of withdrawing into itself, and on the other hand, of persevering in its distinction with respect to that which is not itself.
- The movement of evolution is defined by confrontation and collaboration with the alterity that constitutes reality.

Initially, the person with an egoistic tendency likes himself. But, in order to perdure, he must find means of preserving himself. Consequently, he will have no other choice than to confront himself with the world. This contact with exteriority is capital: it is what will make possible the distinction between soul and mind.

As a tendency first to preservation, as a tension originating toward self and toward others as self, life is love, animation, soul. The soul is the first degree of spiritualization of the living thing, as a tendency towards something.

Consequently, how does the soul constitute mind?

Here sensation intervenes as an urgent point in Pradinesian thought and is distinguished into two categories:

- Laborious sensitivity by which the body seeks that which is useful.
- Defensive sensitivity which consists of fleeing that which threatens.

According to Pradines, philosophy never correctly wondered about the problem of sensation. He takes aim at the empirists as those who missed the essential: they held sensation only as the starting point of knowledge. In reality, philosophy almost always sticks to the causes and never to the function. Sensation, in its function, is precisely of primary importance since someone who provokes it in a living body does so only if the provocation interests the body and acquires a meaning for its life. Sensation is the psychic phenomenon by which life gives itself something to understand the reality with which it is confronted. Nevertheless, if it proves to be paramount, it is not the first criterion of the mind.

It is preceded by affectivity, because it is necessary to perceive in order to sense. Here again, Pradines distinguishes two occurrences:

- Affective or sensitive sensitivity, which, being impersonal, does not provide knowledge of the object but only of the states of pain or pleasure with respect to it. It is not located in any precise part of the body.
- Sensory sensitivity or sensoriality, the perceptive function of given organs, generating more or less precise information.

Sensoriality makes possible the meaning of the need and defense. But it is not more or less affective. Because the affectivity which is fuzzy and vague cannot be divided into degrees, sensoriality is instead more or less representative.

If affectivity (affective sensitivity) is not characterized by pleasure or pain, it is between these two extremes that the sensoriality will be able to exert itself. At this point sensation becomes a perception or what one could call an insensitive sensation.

What can then be made of this apparent paradox?

Space is what is constituted in sensoriality: we always perceive that which is not us according to our adaptation to reality. This is the meaning of defense, which we allow ourselves (through thermal tactition, mechanical tactition, hearing, sight, etc.) because if there is not escape, there is, through detachment, foresight of the possible pain. These meanings are specific to space and thus to the mind because they do not blindly embrace reality but permit an intellectual knowledge through the depth that they establish in our relationships with objects. In being forced to differentiate space, the living thing accedes to the world of the mind, that is to say, to intelligence and knowledge.

== Works ==
- Philosophie de la sensation : I. Les sens du besoin, Paris, Belles Lettres, 1932. II. Les sens de la défense, Paris, Belles Lettres, 1934.
- Traité de psychologie générale, PUF, coll. Dito, Paris, reprinted 1986.
- La fonction perceptive, Cours de la Sorbonne (1941), Paris, Delanoël-Gonthier, 1981.
- L'aventure de l'esprit dans les espèces, Paris, Flammarion, 1954.
- Le beau voyage, Paris, Le Cerf, 1982.

== Sources ==
- Jacques Grappe, La genèse réciproque. Introduction à la psychologie de Maurice Pradines, PUF, 1949.
