= Jean Philibert Damiron =

French philosopher (1794–1862)

Jean-Philibert Damiron (French: [damiʁɔ̃]; 10 January 1794 – 11 January 1862) was a French philosopher.

== Biography ==
Damiron was born at Belleville, Paris. At nineteen, he entered the École Normale, where he studied under Eugène Burnouf, Abel-Francois Villemain, and Victor Cousin. After teaching for several years in provincial towns, he came to Paris, where he lectured on philosophy in various institutions, and finally became professor in the normal school, and titular professor at the Sorbonne. In 1824, he joined Paul-François Dubois and Théodore Simon Jouffroy in establishing Le Globe; and he was also a member of the committee of the society which took for its motto Aide-toi, le ciel t'aidera. In 1833, he was appointed chevalier of the Legion of Honour, and in 1836 member of the Academy of Moral Sciences. Damiron died in Paris.

== Works ==
Damiron works are known for his accounts of French philosophers:

- Nouveaux mélanges philosophiques de Jouffroy (1842), one edition contained a notice of the author, in which Damiron softened and omitted several expressions used by Jouffroy, which were opposed to the system of education adopted by the Sorbonne.
- De la mutilation des manuscrits de M. Jouffroy (1843), an article which gave rise to a bitter controversy, and to a book by Pierre Leroux.
- Essai sur l'histoire de la philosophie en France au XIX^{e} siècle (1828, 3rd ed. 1834)
- Essai sur l'histoire de la philosophie en France au XVII^{e} siècle (1846)
- Mémoires a servir pour l'histoire de la philosophie en France au XVIII^{e} siècle (1858-1864)
- Cours de la philosophie
- De la Providence (1849, 1850)
