= François Picavet =

French philosopher, translator and authority on Kant

François Picavet (17 May 1851, Petit-Fayt, Nord – 23 May 1921, Paris) was a French philosopher, translator and authority on Kant.

He is now best known for an 1891 essay, Les idéologues, on the history of ideas and of scientific theories, philosophy and religious and political ideas in France since 1789.

== Works ==
- Mémoire sur le scepticisme (1884)
- l'Histoire de la philosophie, ce qu'elle a été, ce qu'elle peut être (1888)
- La Mettrie et la critique allemande (1888)
- Maine de Biran de l'an IX à l'an XI (1889)
- Les idéologues. Essai sur l'histoire des idées et des théories scientifiques, philosophiques, religieuses, etc. en France depuis 1789 (1891) online text, reprinted 1971 by Burt Franklin
