= Sensualism =

Epistemological position

In epistemology, sensualism (also sensationalism or sensationism) is a doctrine whereby sensations and perception are the basic and most important form of true cognition. It may oppose abstract ideas.

This question was long ago put forward in Greek philosophy (Stoicism, Epicureanism) and further developed to the full by the British and French Sensualists (John Locke, David Hume, Étienne Bonnot de Condillac) and the British Associationists (Thomas Brown, David Hartley, Joseph Priestley). In the 19th century, it was very much taken up by the Positivists (Auguste Comte, Herbert Spencer, Hippolyte Taine, Émile Littré).

== See also ==
- Empiricism
- Phenomenalism
- Positivism
- Solipsism
- Spiritualism
