= Victor Cousin =

French philosopher (1792–1867)

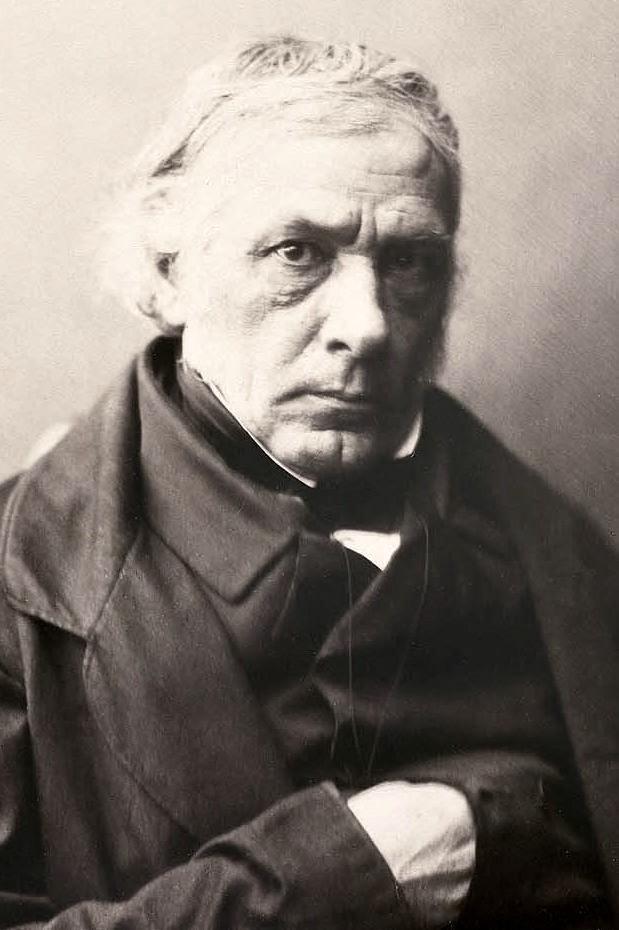
- Portrait by Gustave Le Gray
- Born: 28 November 1792; Paris, France
- Died: 14 January 1867 (aged 74); Cannes, France

Education
- Education: École Normale (B.A., 1811); University of Paris (Dr. ès L., 1813)
- Academic advisors: Pierre Laromiguière; Pierre Paul Royer-Collard

Philosophical work
- Era: Late modern philosophy
- Region: Western philosophy
- School: Continental philosophy Eclectic spiritualism
- Institutions: University of Paris; École Normale
- Notable students: Jean Philibert Damiron, Paul Janet, Théodore Jouffroy, Félix Ravaisson, Jules Simon
- Main interests: Metaphysics, epistemology, ethics, history of philosophy, philosophy of history
- Notable ideas: The two principles of reason (cause and substance) as a passage from psychology (the science of knowledge) to ontology (the science of being)

Victor Cousin (/kuːˈzæn/; French: [kuzɛ̃]; 28 November 1792 – 14 January 1867) was a French philosopher. He was the founder of "eclecticism", a briefly influential school of French philosophy that combined elements of German idealism and Scottish Common Sense Realism. As the administrator of public instruction for over a decade, Cousin also had an important influence on French educational policy.

== Biography ==
=== Early years ===
The son of a watchmaker, he was born in Paris, in the Quartier Saint-Antoine. At the age of ten, he was sent to the local grammar school, the Lycée Charlemagne, where he studied until he was eighteen. Lycées, being organically linked to the University of France and its Faculties since their Napoleonic institution (the baccalauréat was awarded by juries made of university professors), Cousin was "crowned" in the ancient hall of the Sorbonne for a Latin oration he wrote, which earned him a first prize at the concours général, a competition of the best pupils at lycées (established under the Ancien Régime and reinstated under the First French Empire, and still extant). The classical training of the lycée strongly disposed him to literature, or éloquence as it was then called. He was already known among his fellow students for his knowledge of Greek. From the lycée, he graduated to the most prestigious of higher education schools, École Normale Supérieure (then called École Normale), where Pierre Laromiguière was then lecturing on philosophy.

In the second preface to the Fragments philosophiques, in which he candidly states the varied philosophical influences of his life, Cousin speaks of the grateful emotion excited by the memory of the day when he heard Laromiguière for the first time. "That day decided my whole life." Laromiguière taught the philosophy of John Locke and Étienne Bonnot de Condillac, happily modified on some points, with a clearness and grace which in appearance at least removed difficulties, and with a charm of spiritual bonhomie which penetrated and subdued." That school has remained ever since the living heart of French philosophy; Henri Bergson, Jean-Paul Sartre and Jacques Derrida are among its past students.

=== Influences on Cousin's early philosophical thought ===
Cousin wanted to lecture on philosophy and quickly obtained the position of master of conferences (maître de conférences) in the school. The second great philosophical impulse of his life was the teaching of Pierre Paul Royer-Collard. This teacher, he tells us, "by the severity of his logic, the gravity and weight of his words, turned me by degrees, and not without resistance, from the beaten path of Condillac into the way which has since become so easy, but which was then painful and unfrequented, that of the Scottish philosophy [Scottish Common Sense Realism]." In 1815–1816, Cousin attained the position of suppliant (assistant) to Royer-Collard in the history of modern philosophy chair of the Faculty of Letters of the University of Paris. Another thinker who influenced him at this early period was Maine de Biran, whom Cousin regarded as the unequaled psychological observer of his time in France.

These men strongly influenced Cousin's philosophical thought. To Laromiguière, he attributes the lesson of decomposing thought, even though the reduction of it to sensation was inadequate. Royer-Collard taught him that even sensation is subject to certain internal laws and principles which it does not itself explain, which are superior to analysis and the natural patrimony of the mind. De Biran made a special study of the phenomena of the will. He taught him to distinguish in all cognitions, and especially in the simplest facts of consciousness, the voluntary activity in which our personality is truly revealed. It was through this "triple discipline" that Cousin's philosophical thought was first developed, and that in 1815 he began the public teaching of philosophy in the École Normale and in the faculty of letters.

He then took up the study of German, Immanuel Kant and Friedrich Heinrich Jacobi, and sought to master the Ideas Concerning a Philosophy of Nature (1797) of Friedrich Wilhelm Joseph Schelling, which at first greatly attracted him. The influence of Schelling may be observed very markedly in the earlier form of his philosophy. He sympathized with the principle of faith of Jacobi, but regarded it as arbitrary so long as it was not recognized as grounded in reason. In 1817, he went to Germany and met Hegel at Heidelberg. Hegel's Encyclopaedia of the Philosophical Sciences in Basic Outline appeared the same year, and Cousin had one of the earliest copies. He thought Hegel was not particularly amiable, but the two became friends. The following year, Cousin went to Munich, where he met Schelling for the first time, and spent a month with him and Jacobi, obtaining a deeper insight into the Philosophy of Nature.

=== Political troubles disrupt career ===
France's political troubles interfered with his career. In the events of 1814–1815, he took the royalist side. He adopted the views of the party known as doctrinaire, of which Royer-Collard was the philosophical leader. He seems to have gone further and to have approached the extreme Left. Then came a reaction against liberalism, and in 1821–1822, Cousin was deprived of his offices in the faculty of letters and in the École Normale. The École Normale was swept away, and Cousin shared the fate of François Guizot, who was ejected from the chair of history. This enforced abandonment of public teaching was a mixed blessing: he set out for Germany with a view to further philosophical study. While at Berlin in 1824–1825 he was thrown into prison, either on some ill-defined political charge at the instance of the French police, or as a result of an indiscreet conversation. Freed after six months, he remained under suspicion of the French government for three years. It was during this period that he developed what is distinctive in his philosophical doctrine. His eclecticism, his ontology and his philosophy of history were declared in principle and in most of their salient details in the Fragments philosophiques (Paris, 1826). The preface to the second edition (1833) and the third (1838) aimed at a vindication of his principles against contemporary criticism. Even the best of his later books, the Philosophie écossaise, the Du vrai, du beau, et du bien, and the Philosophie de Locke, were simply matured revisions of his lectures during the period from 1815 to 1820. The lectures on Locke were first sketched in 1819 and fully developed in the course of 1829.

During the seven years when he was prevented from teaching, he produced, besides the Fragments, the edition of the works of Proclus (6 vols., 1820–1827), and the works of René Descartes (II vols., 1826). He also commenced his Translation of Plato (13 vols.), which occupied his leisure time from 1825 to 1840. One sees in the Fragments very distinctly the fusion of the different philosophical influences by which his opinions were finally matured. For Cousin was as eclectic in thought and habit of mind as he was in philosophical principle and system. It is with the publication of the Fragments of 1826 that the first great widening of his reputation is associated. In 1827, followed the Cours de l'histoire de la philosophie.

=== Reinstatement at the university ===
In 1828, Antoine Lefebvre de Vatimesnil, Minister of Public Instruction (1828–1829) in Martignac's ministry, recalled Cousin and Guizot to their professorial positions at the university (École Normale). The three years which followed were the period of Cousin's greatest triumph as a lecturer. His return to the chair was the symbol of the triumph of constitutional ideas and was greeted with enthusiasm. The hall of the Sorbonne was crowded, as the hall of no philosophical teacher in Paris had been since the days of Pierre Abélard. The lecturer's eloquence mingled with speculative exposition, and he possessed a singular power of rhetorical climax. His philosophy showed the generalizing tendency of the French intellect and its logical need for grouping details around central principles.

There was a moral elevation in Cousin's spiritual philosophy which touched the hearts of his listeners, and seemed to be the basis for higher development in national literature and art, and even in politics, than the traditional philosophy of France. His lectures produced more ardent disciples than those of any other contemporary professor of philosophy. Judged on his teaching influence, Cousin occupies a foremost place in the rank of professors of philosophy, who like Jacobi, Schelling and Dugald Stewart have united the gifts of speculative, expository and imaginative power. The taste for philosophy—especially its history—was revived in France to an extent unknown since the 17th century.

=== Influence on others ===
Among those influenced by Cousin were Edgar Allan Poe, Théodore Jouffroy, Jean Philibert Damiron, Adolphe Garnier, Pierre-Joseph Proudhon, Jules Barthélemy Saint-Hilaire, Felix Ravaisson, Charles de Rémusat, Orestes Brownson, Ralph Waldo Emerson, Jules Simon, Paul Janet, Adolphe Franck and Patrick Edward Dove, who dedicated his book The Theory of Human Progression (1850) to him—Jouffroy and Damiron were first fellow-followers and then disciples. Jouffroy always kept firm to the early—the French and Scottish—impulses of Cousin's teaching. Cousin continued to lecture for two and a half years after his return to the chair. Sympathizing with the revolution of July, he was at once recognized by the new government as a friend of national liberty. Writing in June 1833, he explains both his philosophical and his political position: "I had the advantage of holding united against me for many years both the sensational and the theological school. In 1830, both schools descended into the arena of politics. The sensational school quite naturally produced the demagogic party, and the theological school became quite as naturally absolutism, safe to borrow from time to time the mask of the demagogue in order to better reach its ends, as in philosophy it is by scepticism that it undertakes to restore theocracy. On the other hand, he who combated any exclusive principle in science was bound to reject also any exclusive principle in the state, and to defend representative government."

=== Effect on primary instruction ===
The government was not slow to honour him. He was induced by the ministry of which his friend François Guizot was the head to become a member of the council of public instruction and counsellor of state, and in 1832 he was made a Peer of France. He ceased to lecture, but retained the title of professor of philosophy. Finally, he accepted the position of minister of public instruction in 1840 under Adolphe Thiers. He was, in addition, director of the École Normale and virtual head of the university, and from 1840 a member of the Academy of the Moral and Political Sciences in the Institut de France. His character and his official position at this period gave him great power in the university and in the educational arrangements of the country.

The most important work he accomplished during this period was the organization of primary instruction. It was to the efforts of Cousin that France owed her advance, in relation to primary education, between 1830 and 1848. Prussia and Saxony had set the national example, and France was guided into it by Cousin. Forgetful of national calamity and of personal wrong, he looked to Prussia as affording the best example of an organized system of national education; and he was persuaded that "to carry back the education of Prussia into France afforded a nobler (if a bloodless) triumph than the trophies of Austerlitz and Jena." In the summer of 1831, commissioned by the government, he visited Frankfurt and Saxony and spent some time in Berlin. The result was a series of reports to the minister, afterwards published as Rapport sur l'État de l'instruction publique dans quelques pays de l'Allemagne et particulièrement en Prusse (cf. De l'instruction publique en Hollande, 1837). His views were readily accepted on his return to France, and soon afterwards, through his influence, the law of primary instruction was passed. (See his Exposé des motifs et projet de loi sur l'instruction primaire, présentés à la chambre des députés, séance du 2 janvier 1837.)

In the words of the Edinburgh Review (July 1833), these documents "mark an epoch in the progress of national education, and are directly conducive to results important not only to France but to Europe." The Report was translated into English by Sarah Austin in 1834. The translation was frequently reprinted in the United States of America. The legislatures of New Jersey and Massachusetts distributed it in the schools at the expense of the states. Cousin remarks that, among all the literary distinctions which he had received, "None has touched me more than the title of foreign member of the American Institute for Education." To the enlightened views of the ministries of Guizot and Thiers under the citizen-king, and to the zeal and ability of Cousin in the work of organization, France owes what is best in her system of primary education,—a national interest which had been neglected under the French Revolution, the Empire and the Restoration (see his Exposé, p. 17). In the first two years of the reign of Louis Philippe, more was done for the education of the people than had been either sought or accomplished in all the history of France. In defence of university studies, he stood manfully forth in the chamber of peers in 1844, against the clerical party on the one hand and the levelling or Philistine party on the other. His speeches on this occasion were published in a tractate Défense de l'université et de la philosophie (1844 and 1845).

=== Writing period 1835 to 1865 ===
This period of official life from 1835 to 1865 was spent, so far as philosophical study was concerned, in revising his former lectures and writings—in maturing them for publication or reissue. In 1835, there appeared De la Métaphysique d'Aristote, suivi d'un essai de traduction du premier et du douzième livres; in 1836, Cours de philosophie professé à la faculté des lettres pendant l'année 1818, and Œuvres inédites d'Abélard. This Cours de philosophie appeared later in 1854 as Du vrai, du beau, et du bien. From 1825 to 1840, there appeared Cours de l'histoire de la philosophie and in 1829 Manuel de l'histoire de la philosophie de Tennemann, translated from the German. In 1840–1841, we have Cours d'histoire de la philosophie morale au XVIII^{e} siècle (5 vols.). In 1841, there appeared his edition of the Œuvres philosophiques de Maine-de-Biran; in 1842, Leçons de philosophie sur Kant (Eng. trans. AG Henderson, 1854), and in the same year Des Pensées de Pascal. The Nouveaux fragments were gathered together and republished in 1847. Later, in 1859, there appeared Petri Abaelardi Opera.

Also during this period, Cousin seems to have turned with fresh interest to those literary studies which he had abandoned for speculation under the influence of Laromiguière and Royer-Collard. To this renewed interest we owe his studies of men and women of note in France in the 17th century. As the results of his work in this line, we have, besides the Des Pensées de Pascal (1842), Études sur les femmes et la société du XVII. siècle (1853–65). He has sketched Jacqueline Pascal (1844), Madame de Longueville (1853), the marquise de Sable (1854), the duchesse de Chevreuse (1856), Marie de Hautefort (1856). Cousin was elected a Foreign Honorary Member of the American Academy of Arts and Sciences in 1855.

When the reign of Louis Philippe came to a close through the opposition of his ministry, with Guizot at its head, to the demand for electoral reform and through the policy of the Spanish marriages, Cousin, who was opposed to the government on these points, lent his sympathy to Cavaignac and the Provisional government. He published a pamphlet entitled Justice et charité, the purport of which showed the moderation of his political views. It was markedly antisocialist. But from this period he passed almost entirely from public life, and ceased to wield the personal influence which he had done during the preceding years. After the coup d'état of 2 December, he was deprived of his position as a permanent member of the superior council of public instruction. From Napoleon and the Empire he stood aloof. A decree of 1852 placed him along with Guizot and Villemain in the rank of honorary professors. His sympathies were apparently with the monarchy, under certain constitutional safeguards. Speaking in 1853 of the political issues of the spiritual philosophy which he had taught during his lifetime, he says: "It conducts human societies to the true republic, that dream of all generous souls, which in our time can be realized in Europe only by constitutional monarchy."

=== Death ===
During the last years of his life, he occupied a suite of rooms in the Sorbonne, where he lived simply and unostentatiously. The chief feature of the rooms was his noble library, the cherished collection of a lifetime. He died in Cannes on 14 January 1867. In front of the Sorbonne, below the lecture rooms of the faculty of letters, a tablet records an extract from his will, in which he bequeaths his noble and cherished library to the halls of his professorial work and triumphs.

== Philosophy ==
=== Three distinctive points ===
There are three distinctive points in Cousin's philosophy. These are his method, the results of his method, and the application of the method and its results to history, especially to the history of philosophy. It is usual to speak of his philosophy as eclecticism. It is eclectic only in a secondary and subordinate sense. All eclecticism that is not self-condemned and inoperative implies a system of doctrine as its basis, in fact, a criterion of truth. Otherwise, as Cousin himself remarks, it is simply a blind and useless syncretism. And Cousin saw and proclaimed from an early period in his philosophical teaching the necessity of a system on which to base his eclecticism. This is indeed advanced as an illustration or confirmation of the truth of his system, as a proof that the facts of history correspond to his analysis of consciousness. These three points, the method, the results, and the philosophy of history, are with him intimately connected. They are developments in a natural order of sequence. They become in practice psychology (or the science of knowledge), ontology (or the science of being) and eclecticism in history.

Cousin strongly insisted on the importance of method in philosophy. That which he adopts is the ordinary one of observation, analysis and induction. This observational method is the method which Descartes began and abandoned, and which Locke and Condillac applied, though imperfectly, and which Thomas Reid and Kant used with more success. Cousin insists that this is the true method of philosophy as applied to consciousness, in which alone the facts of experience appear. But the proper condition of the application of the method is that it shall not, through prejudice of system, omit a single fact of consciousness. If the authority of consciousness is good in one instance, it is good in all. If not to be trusted in one, it is not to be trusted in any. Previous systems have erred in not presenting the facts of consciousness.

=== Observational method ===
The observational method applied to consciousness gives us the science of psychology. This is the basis and the only proper one of ontology (or metaphysics, the science of being) and of the philosophy of history. To the observation of consciousness, Cousin adds induction as the complement of his method, by which he means inference as to reality necessitated by the data of consciousness, and regulated by certain laws found in consciousness, those of reason. By his method of observation and induction as thus explained, his philosophy will be found to be marked off very clearly, on the one hand from the deductive construction of notions of an absolute system, as represented either by Schelling or Hegel, which Cousin regards as based simply on hypothesis and abstraction, illegitimately obtained; and on the other, from that of Kant, and in a sense, from that of Scottish metaphysician Sir William Hamilton, 9th Baronet, both of which in the view of Cousin are limited to psychology, and merely relative or phenomenal knowledge, and issue in scepticism so far as the great realities of ontology are concerned. What Cousin finds psychologically in the individual consciousness, he finds also spontaneously expressed in the common sense or universal experience of humanity. In fact, it is for him the function of philosophy to classify and explain universal convictions and beliefs; but common-sense is not for him philosophy, nor is it the instrument of philosophy; it is simply the material on which the philosophical method works, and in harmony with which its results must ultimately be found.

=== Three results of psychological observation ===
The three great results of psychological observation are Sensibility, Activity or Liberty, and Reason. These three facts are different in character, but are not found apart in consciousness. Sensations, or the facts of the sensibility, are necessary. The facts of reason are also necessary, and reason is no less independent of the will than the sensibility. Voluntary facts alone have the characteristics of imputability and personality. The will alone is the person or Me. The Me is the centre of the intellectual sphere, without which consciousness is impossible. We find ourselves in a strange world, between two orders of phenomena which do not belong to us, which we apprehend only on the condition of our distinguishing ourselves from them. Further, we apprehend by means of a light which does not come from ourselves. All light comes from the reason, and it is the reason which apprehends both itself and the sensibility which envelops it, and the will which it obliges but does not constrain. Consciousness, then, is composed of these three integrant and inseparable elements. But Reason is the immediate ground of knowledge and of consciousness itself.

But there is a peculiarity in Cousin's doctrine of activity or freedom, and in his doctrine of reason, which enters deeply into his system. This is the element of spontaneity in volition and in reason. This is the heart of what is new in his doctrine of knowledge and being. Liberty or freedom is a generic term which means a cause or being endowed with self-activity. This is to itself and its own development its own ultimate cause. Free-will is so, although it is preceded by deliberation and determination, i.e. reflection, for we are always conscious that even after determination we are free to will or not to will. But there is a primary kind of volition which has no reflection for its condition, which is yet free and spontaneous. We must have willed thus spontaneously first; we could not know, before our reflective volition, that we could will and act. Spontaneous volition is free as reflective, but it is the prior act of the two. This view of liberty of will is the only one in accordance with the facts of humanity; it excludes reflective volition, and explains the enthusiasm of the poet and the artist in the act of creation; it explains also the ordinary actions of mankind, which are done as a rule spontaneously and not after reflective deliberation.

=== Doctrine of reason ===
But it is in his doctrine of reason that the distinctive principle of the philosophy of Cousin lies. The reason given to us by psychological observation, the reason of our consciousness, is impersonal in its nature. We do not make it; its character is precisely the opposite of individuality; it is universal and necessary. The recognition of universal and necessary principles in knowledge is the essential point in psychology; it ought to be put first and emphasized to the last that these exist and that they are wholly impersonal or absolute. The number of these principles, their enumeration and classification, is an important point, but it is secondary to that of the recognition of their true nature. This was the point which Kant missed in his analysis, and this is the fundamental truth which Cousin thinks he has restored to the integrity of philosophy by the method of the observation of consciousness. And how is this impersonality or absoluteness of the conditions of knowledge to be established? The answer is in substance that Kant went wrong in putting necessity first as the criterion of those laws. This brought them within the sphere of reflection, and gave as their guarantee the impossibility of thinking them reversed; and led to their being regarded as wholly relative to human intelligence, restricted to the sphere of the phenomenal, incapable of revealing to us substantial reality—necessary, yet subjective. But this test of necessity is a wholly secondary one; these laws are not thus guaranteed to us; they are each and all given to us, given to our consciousness, in an act of spontaneous apperception or apprehension, immediately, instantaneously, in a sphere above the reflective consciousness, yet within the reach of knowledge. And "All subjectivity with all reflection expires in the spontaneity of apperception. The reason becomes subjective by relation to the voluntary and free self, but in itself it is impersonal; it belongs not to this or to that self in humanity; it belongs not even to humanity. We may say with truth that nature and humanity belong to it, for without its laws both would perish."

But what is the number of those laws? Kant, reviewing the enterprise of Aristotle in modern times, has given a complete list of the laws of thought, but it is arbitrary in classification and may be legitimately reduced. According to Cousin, there are but two primary laws of thought, that of causality and that of substance. From these flow naturally all the others. In the order of nature, that of substance is the first and causality second. In the order of acquisition of our knowledge, causality precedes substance, or rather, both are given to us in each other, and are contemporaneous in consciousness.

These principles of reason, cause and substance, given thus psychologically, enable us to pass beyond the limits of the relative and subjective to objective and absolute reality; they enable us, in a word, to pass from psychology (or the science of knowledge) to ontology (or the science of being). These laws are inextricably mixed in consciousness with the data of volition and sensation, with free activity and fatal action or impression, and they guide us in rising to a personal being, a self or free cause, and to an impersonal reality, a not-me—nature, the world of force—lying out of us, and modifying us. As I refer to myself the act of attention and volition, so I cannot but refer the sensation to some cause, necessarily other than myself, that is, to an external cause, whose existence is as certain for me as my own existence, since the phenomenon which suggests it to me is as certain as the phenomenon which had suggested my reality, and both are given in each other. I thus reach an objective, impersonal world of forces which corresponds to the variety of my sensations. The relation of these forces or causes to each other is the order of the universe.

But these two forces, the me and the not-me, are reciprocally limitative. As reason has apprehended these two simultaneous phenomena, attention and sensation, and led us immediately to conceive the two sorts of distinct absolute causes, correlative and reciprocally finite, to which they are related, so, from the notion of this limitation, we find it impossible under the same guide not to conceive a supreme cause, absolute and infinite, itself the first and last cause of all. This cause is self-sufficient and is sufficient for the reason. This is God; he must be conceived under the notion of cause, related to humanity and the world. He is an absolute substance only insofar as he is the absolute cause of philosophy and his essence lies precisely in his creative power. He thus creates, and he creates necessarily.

This theodicy of Cousin laid him open obviously enough to the charge of pantheism. This he repels, and his answer may be summed up as follows. Pantheism is properly the deification of the law of phenomena, the universe God. But I distinguish the two finite causes, self and not-self, from each other and from the infinite cause. They are not mere modifications of this cause or properties, as with Spinoza,—they are free forces having their power or spring of action in themselves, and this is sufficient for our idea of independent finite reality. I hold this, and I hold the relation of these as effects to the one supreme cause. The God I plead for is neither the deity of Pantheism, nor the absolute unity of the Eleatics, a being divorced from all possibility of creation or plurality, a mere metaphysical abstraction. The deity I maintain is creative, and necessarily creative. The deity of Spinoza and the Eleatics is a mere substance, not a cause in any sense. As to the necessity under which Deity exists of acting or creating, this is the highest form of liberty; it is the freedom of spontaneity, activity without deliberation. His action is not the result of a struggle between passion and virtue. He is free in an unlimited manner; the purest spontaneity in man is but the shadow of the freedom of God. He acts freely but not arbitrarily, and with the consciousness of being able to choose the opposite part. He cannot deliberate or will as we do. His spontaneous action excludes at once the efforts and the miseries of will and the mechanical operation of necessity.

The elements found in consciousness are also to be found in the history of humanity and in the history of philosophy. In external nature, there are expansions and contractions which correspond to spontaneity and reflection. External nature, again in contrast with humanity, expresses spontaneity; humanity expresses reflection. In human history, the East represents the spontaneous stage; the Pagan and Christian world represent stages of reflection. This was afterwards modified, expanded and more fully expressed by saying that humanity in its universal development has three principal moments. First, in the spontaneous stage, where reflection is not yet developed, and art is imperfect, humanity has thought only of the immensity around it. It is preoccupied with the infinite. Secondly, in the reflective stage, the mind has become an object to itself. It thus knows itself explicitly or reflectively. Its own individuality is now the only or at least the supreme thing. This is the moment of the finite. Thirdly, there comes an epoch in which the self or me is subordinated. Mind realizes another power in the universe. The finite and the infinite become two real correlatives in the relation of cause and product. This is the third and highest stage of development, the relation of the finite and the infinite. As philosophy is but the highest expression of humanity, these three moments will be represented in its history. The East typifies the infinite, Greece the finite or reflective epoch, the modern era the stage of relation or correlation of the infinite and the finite. In theology, the dominant philosophical idea of each of these epochs results in pantheism, polytheism, and theism. In politics, we have a correspondence also with the ideas of monarchy, democracy, and constitutional polity.

Eclecticism thus means the application of the psychological method to the history of philosophy. Confronting the various systems co-ordinated as sensualism, idealism, skepticism, mysticism, with the facts of consciousness, the chasm result was reached "Each system expresses an order of phenomena and ideas, which is in truth very real, but which is not alone in consciousness, and which at the same time holds an almost exclusive place in the system; whence it follows that each system is not false but incomplete, and that in re-uniting all incomplete systems, we should have a complete philosophy, adequate to the totality of consciousness." Philosophy, as thus perfected, would not be a mere aggregation of systems, as is ignorantly supposed, but an integration of the truth in each system after the false or incomplete is discarded.

=== Comparison to Kant, Schelling and Hegel ===
Such is the system in outline. The historical position of the system lies in its relations to Kant, Schelling and Hegel. Cousin opposed Kant by asserting that the unconditioned, conceived as an infinite or absolute cause, is merely an unrealizable attempt and something different from mere negation, though not equivalent to a positive thought. With Cousin, the absolute as the ground of being is grasped positively by the intelligence, and it renders all else intelligible; it is not, as with Kant, a certain hypothetical or regulative need.

With Schelling again, Cousin agrees in regarding this supreme ground of all as positively apprehended, and as a source of development, but he utterly repudiates Schelling's method. The intellectual intuition either falls under the eye of consciousness, or it does not. If not, how do you know it and its object which are identical? If it does, it comes within the sphere of psychology, and the objections to it as thus a relative, made by Schelling himself, are to be dealt with. Schelling's intellectual intuition is the mere negation of knowledge.

Again, the pure being of Hegel is a mere abstraction, a hypothesis illegitimately assumed, which he has nowhere sought to vindicate. The very point to be established is the possibility of reaching being per se or pure being; yet in the Hegelian system, this is the very thing assumed as a starting-point. Besides this, of course, objections might be made to the method of development, as not only subverting the principle of contradiction, but as galvanizing negation into a means of advancing or developing the whole body of human knowledge and reality. The intellectual intuition of Schelling, as above consciousness, the pure being of Hegel, as an empty abstraction, unvindicated, illegitimately assumed, and arbitrarily developed, are equally useless as bases of metaphysics. This led Cousin, still holding by essential knowledge of being, to ground it in an analysis of consciousness, in psychology.

=== The absolute or infinite ===
The absolute or infinite—the unconditioned ground and source of all reality—is yet apprehended by us as an immediate datum or reality; and it is apprehended in consciousness—under its condition, that, to wit, of distinguishing subject and object, knower and known. The doctrine of Cousin was criticized by Sir William Hamilton in the Edinburgh Review of 1829, and it was animadverted upon about the same time by Schelling. Hamilton's objections are as follows. The correlation of the ideas of infinite and finite does not necessarily imply their correality, as Cousin supposes; on the contrary, it is a presumption that the finite is simply the positive and the infinite the negative of the same thing—that the finite and the infinite are simply contradictory relatives. Of these, "The positive alone is real, the negative is only an abstraction of the other, and in the highest generality even an abstraction of thought itself." A study of the few sentences under this head might have obviated the trifling criticism of Hamilton's objection which has been set afloat recently, that the denial of a knowledge of the absolute or infinite implies a foregone knowledge of it. How can you deny the reality of that which you do not know? The answer to this is that in the case of contradictory statements—A and not A—the latter is a mere negation of the former, and posits nothing; and the negation of a notion with positive attributes, as the finite, does not extend beyond abolishing the given attributes as an object of thought. The infinite or non-finite is not necessarily known, ere the finite is negated, or in order to negate it; all that needs be known is the finite itself, and the contradictory negation of it implies no positive. Non-organized may or may not correspond to a positive—i.e. an object or notion with qualities contradictory to the organized; but the mere sublation of the organized does not posit it, or suppose that it is known beforehand, or that anything exists corresponding to it. This is one among many flaws in the Hegelian dialectic, and it paralyzes the whole of logic. Secondly, the conditions of intelligence, which Cousin allows, necessarily exclude the possibility of knowledge of the absolute—they are held to be incompatible with its unity. Here, Schelling and Hamilton argue that Cousin's absolute is a mere relative. Thirdly, it is objected that in order to deduce the conditioned, Cousin makes his absolute a relative; for he makes it an absolute cause, i.e. a cause existing absolutely under relation. As such, it is necessarily inferior to the sum total of its effects, and dependent for reality on these—in a word, a mere potence or becoming. Further, as a theory of creation, it makes creation a necessity and destroys the notion of the divine. Cousin made no reply to Hamilton's criticism beyond alleging that Hamilton's doctrine necessarily restricted human knowledge and certainty to psychology and logic, and destroyed metaphysics by introducing nescience and uncertainty into its highest sphere, theodicy.

The attempt to render the laws of reason or thought impersonal by professing to find them in the sphere of spontaneous apperception, and above reflective necessity, is unsuccessful. Cause, substance, time, space are given to us as realized in a particular form. In no single act of affirmation of cause or substance, much less in such a primitive act, do we affirm the universality of their application. There may be particular instances or cases of these laws, but we could never get the laws themselves in their universality, far less absolute impersonality. No amount of individual instances of the application of any of them by us would give it a true universality. The only sure test we have of their universality in our experience is the test of their reflective necessity. We thus, after all, fall back on reflection as our ground for their universal application; mere spontaneity of apprehension is futile; their universality is grounded in their necessity, not their necessity in their universality. How far and in what sense this ground of necessity renders them personal are, of course, questions still to be solved.

But if these three correlative facts are immediately given, it seems to be thought possible by Cousin to vindicate them in reflective consciousness. He seeks to trace the steps which the reason has spontaneously and consciously, but irreflectively, followed. And here the question arises—Can we vindicate in a reflective or mediate process this spontaneous apprehension of reality?

=== The self ===
The self is found to be a cause of force, free in its action, on the ground that we are obliged to relate the volition of consciousness to the self as its cause, and its ultimate cause. It is not clear from the analysis whether the self is immediately observed as an acting or originating cause, or whether reflection working on the principle of causality is compelled to infer its existence and character. If the self is actually so given, we do not need the principle of causality to infer it; if it is not so given, causality could never give us either the notion or the fact of the self as a cause or force, far less as an ultimate one. All that it could do would be to warrant a cause of some sort, but not this or that reality as the cause. And further, the principle of causality, if fairly carried out, as universal and necessary, would not allow us to stop at personality or will as the ultimate cause of its effect—volition. Once applied to the facts at all, it would drive us beyond the first antecedent or term of antecedents of volition to a still further cause or ground—in fact, land us in an infinite regress of causes.

The same criticism is even more emphatically applicable to the influence of a not-self, or world of forces, corresponding to our sensations, and the cause of them. Starting from sensation as our basis, causality could never give us this, even though it is allowed that sensation is impersonal to the extent of being independent of our volition. Causality might tell us that a cause there is of sensation somewhere and of some sort; but that this cause is a force or sum of forces, existing in space, independently of us, and corresponding to our sensations, it could never tell us, for the simple reason that such a notion is not supposed to exist in our consciousness. Causality cannot add to the number of our notions, and cannot add to the number of realities we know. All it can do is necessitate us to think that a cause there is of a given change, but what that cause is, it cannot of itself inform us, or even suggest to us, beyond implying that it must be to the effect. Sensation might arise, for aught we know, so far as causality leads us, not from a world of forces at all, but from a will like our own, though infinitely more powerful, acting upon us, partly furthering and partly thwarting us. And indeed such a supposition is, with the principle of causality at work, within the limits of probability, as we are already supposed to know such a reality—a will—in our own consciousness. When Cousin thus set himself to vindicate those points by reflection, he gave up the obvious advantage of his other position that the realities in question are given us in immediate and spontaneous apprehension. The same criticism applies equally to the inference of an absolute cause from the two limited forces which he names self and not-self. Immediate spontaneous apperception may seize this supreme reality, but to vindicate it by reflection as an inference on the principle of causality is impossible. This is a mere paralogism; we can never infer either absolute or infinite from relative or finite.

The truth is that Cousin's doctrine of the spontaneous apperception of impersonal truth amounts to little more than a presentment in philosophical language of the ordinary convictions and beliefs of mankind. This is important as a preliminary stage, but philosophy properly begins when it attempts to coordinate or systematize those convictions in harmony, to conciliate apparent contradiction and opposition, as between the correlative notions of the finite and the infinite, the apparently conflicting notions of personality and infinitude, self and not-self; in a word, to reconcile the various sides of consciousness with each other. And whether the laws of our reason are the laws of all intelligence and being—whether and how we are to relate our fundamental, intellectual and moral conceptions to what is beyond our experience, or to an infinite being—are problems which Cousin cannot be regarded as having solved. These are, in truth, the outstanding problems of modern philosophy.

Cousin's doctrine of spontaneity in volition can hardly be said to be more successful than his impersonality of the reason through volitional spontaneous apperception. Sudden, unpremeditated volition may be the earliest and the most artistic, but it is not the best. Volition is essentially a free choice between alternatives, and that is best which is most deliberate, because it is most rational. The sudden and unpremeditated wish represented by the former is wholly inferior in character to the free choice of the latter, guided and illumined by intelligence. In this, we can deliberately resolve upon what is in our power; in that we are subject to the vain impulse of wishing the impossible. Spontaneity is pleasing, sometimes beautiful, but it is not in this instance the highest quality of the thing to be obtained. That is to be found in a guiding and illumining reflective activity.

Eclecticism is not open to the superficial objection of proceeding without a system or test in determining the complete or incomplete. But it is open to objection, assuming that a particular analysis of consciousness has reached all the possible elements in humanity and in history, and all their combinations. It may be asked, Can history have that which is not in the individual consciousness? In a sense, not; but our analysis may not give all that is there, and we ought not at once to impose that analysis or any formula on history. History is as likely to reveal to us, in the first place, true and original elements and combinations of elements in man as a study of consciousness. Besides, the tendency of applying a formula of this sort to history is to assume that the elements are developed in a certain regular or necessary order, whereas this may not at all be the case; but we may find at any epoch the whole mixed, either crossing or cooperative, as in the consciousness of the individual himself. Further, the question as to how these elements may possibly have grown up in the general consciousness of mankind is assumed to be nonexistent or impossible.

It was the tendency of the philosophy of Cousin to be observational and generalizing rather than analytic and discriminating. As such, he left no notable works of systematic philosophy, but general psychological analyses, and well considered expositions of philosophical systems, especially that of Locke and the philosophers of Scotland. He was familiar with the broad lines of most systems of philosophy.

Sir W. Hamilton (Discussions, p. 541), one of his most resolute opponents, described Cousin as "A profound and original thinker, a lucid and eloquent writer, a scholar equally at home in ancient and in modern learning, a philosopher superior to all prejudices of age or country, party or profession, and whose lofty eclecticism, seeking truth under every form of opinion, traces its unity even through the most hostile systems."

== Works ==
- 1826: Fragments philosophiques
- 1840: Cours de philosophie morale – Philosophie scolastique
- 1841: Cours d'histoire de la philosophie moderne
- 1846: Philosophie populaire
- 1848: Justice et charité
- 1855: Premiers essais de philosophie
- 1858: Du vrai, du beau et du bien
- 1861: Histoire générale de la philosophie

== See also ==
- Discours sur les passions de l'amour
