= Late Marx =

Final period of Karl Marx's thought

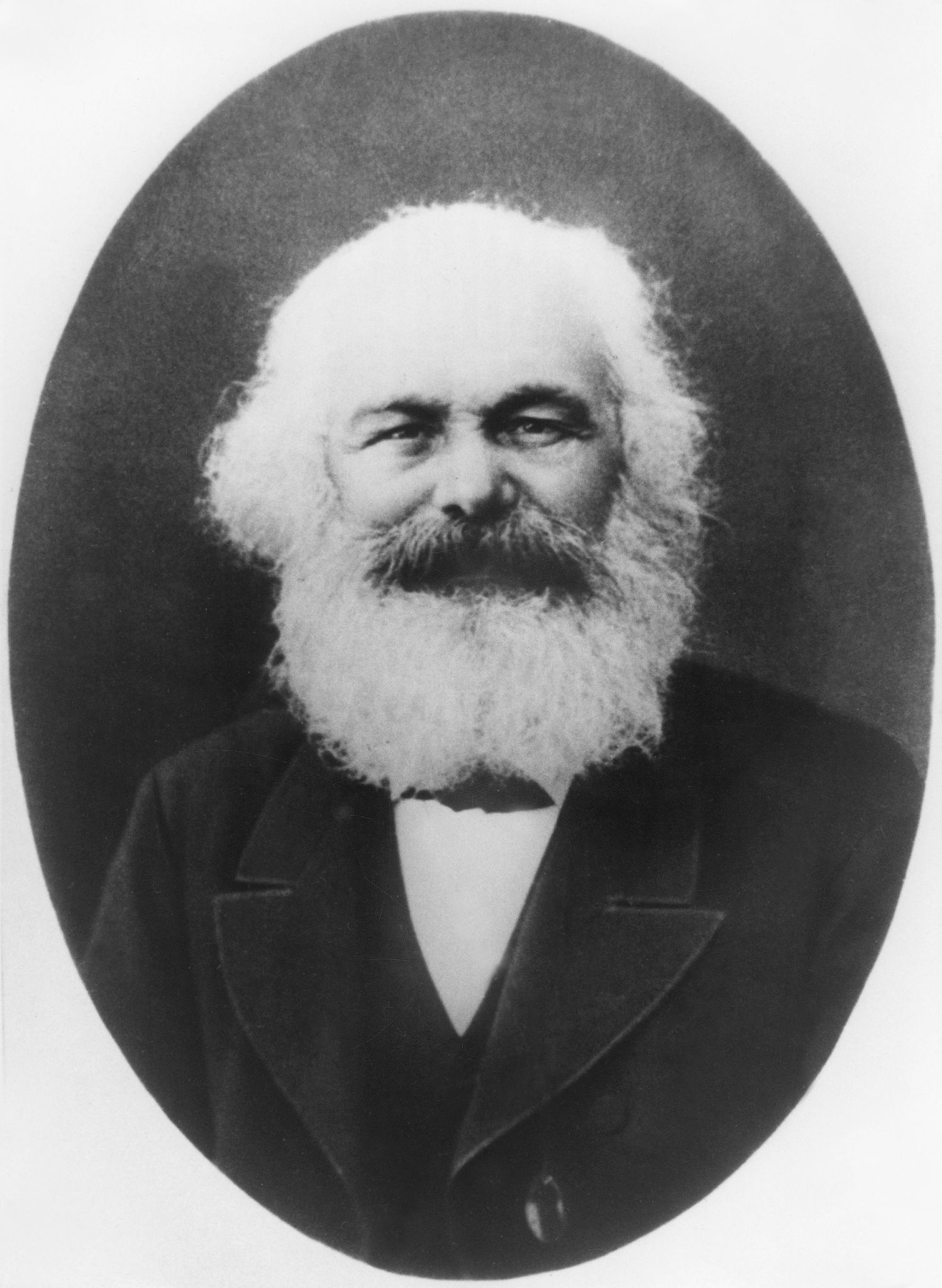
The last photograph of Karl Marx, taken in Algiers in 1882

The late Marx refers to the work of Karl Marx from the late 1860s until his death in 1883. This period is characterized by a sustained engagement with topics that were less central to his earlier work, including non-Western societies, the role of colonialism, and the possibility of multiple paths of social development. Having completed the first German edition of Capital, Volume I in 1867, Marx spent much of his final decade researching and writing on Russia, anthropology, and pre-capitalist social forms. This work was conducted amidst severe ill-health and continued engagement with global political events.

Key texts from this period include Marx's writings on Ireland from 1869–70, his 1871 address on the Paris Commune (The Civil War in France), significant revisions for the 1872–1875 French edition of Capital, his 1875 Critique of the Gotha Programme, his correspondence with Russian populists such as Vera Zasulich, and his anthropological notebooks (known as The Ethnological Notebooks). In these later works, Marx explored the potential for agrarian, non-capitalist societies like Russia to achieve a communist transformation without first undergoing the full development of industrial capitalism, provided such a revolution could link up with a proletarian revolution in Western Europe. He also gave greater attention to gender relations, colonialism as a system of domination, and forms of resistance in colonized societies such as India, Algeria, and Latin America.

Scholarly interpretation of this period is divided. Early scholars and editors of Marx's work, including Friedrich Engels and David Riazanov, tended to view his late-life focus on anthropology and non-European societies as a sign of intellectual decline, marred by digressions from his main work on political economy. However, since the late 20th century, a growing body of scholarship has argued that these late writings represent a crucial and creative development in his thought. This modern perspective sees the late Marx as offering a critique of Eurocentrism and a more nuanced understanding of global history, gender, and the complex relationship between class, race, and nationalism.

== Background: Evolution of thought ==
According to scholar Kevin B. Anderson, Karl Marx's late-period focus on non-Western societies and multilinear paths of development was the culmination of an intellectual evolution that began in the 1850s. His earlier work, most famously the 1848 The Communist Manifesto, contained what Anderson describes as a "problematically unilinear concept of social progress." The Manifesto presented Western colonial incursions into Asia as a brutal but historically progressive force that would draw "even the most barbarian, nations into civilization" and compel them to adopt the bourgeois mode of production.

This perspective was elaborated in Marx's 1853 articles on India for the New-York Tribune, in which he portrayed British colonialism as an "unconscious tool of history" that would annihilate "old Asiatic society" and lay the material foundations for Western society in Asia. At this time, Marx viewed pre-colonial Indian society as unchanging and characterized by "Oriental despotism," which he argued was based on the self-sufficient village commune. However, even in 1853, Anderson identifies a shift in Marx's thinking, as he also described British colonialism as a form of "barbarism" and looked forward to the day when "the Hindoos themselves shall have grown strong enough to throw off the English yoke altogether."

By 1856–57, Marx's position became more strongly anti-colonialist as he supported the Chinese resistance during the Second Opium War and the Indian Sepoy Uprising. This period coincided with the writing of the Grundrisse (1857–58), where Marx first developed a "truly multilinear theory of history." He analyzed pre-capitalist social forms—delineating Asiatic, Greco-Roman, and Germanic types—and argued that Asian societies had a developmental path distinct from that of Western Europe. He also began to see the communal forms of the Indian village in a more nuanced light, suggesting they could be either democratic or despotic.

In the 1860s, while primarily focused on completing Capital, Marx's work with the International Workingmen's Association (First International) led him to engage deeply with nationalism, race, and ethnicity. His writings on the American Civil War (1861–65) analyzed the relationship between slavery and capitalism, concluding that "labor in a white skin cannot emancipate itself where it is branded in a black skin." His analysis of the Polish uprising of 1863 reaffirmed his long-held view that Polish independence was a crucial precondition for a democratic revolution in Germany and across Europe. His intensive study of the Irish question led him to a significant theoretical shift that marked the beginning of his late period. By 1869–70, he concluded that his earlier view—that an English working-class revolution would precede and enable Irish independence—was wrong. He now argued that the "lever must be applied in Ireland"; Irish independence had become the "first condition" for the social emancipation of the English working class, as British oppression of Ireland created a crucial antagonism between English and Irish workers that bound the English proletariat to its own ruling class.

== Key works and themes (1869–1883) ==
During his final decade, Marx deepened his research into non-Western societies, anthropology, and non-capitalist social forms. Anderson argues that this work can be understood through his revisions to the French edition of Capital; his extensive research notebooks on anthropology and world history; and his writings on the revolutionary potential in Russia.

=== The Civil War in France and the Paris Commune ===
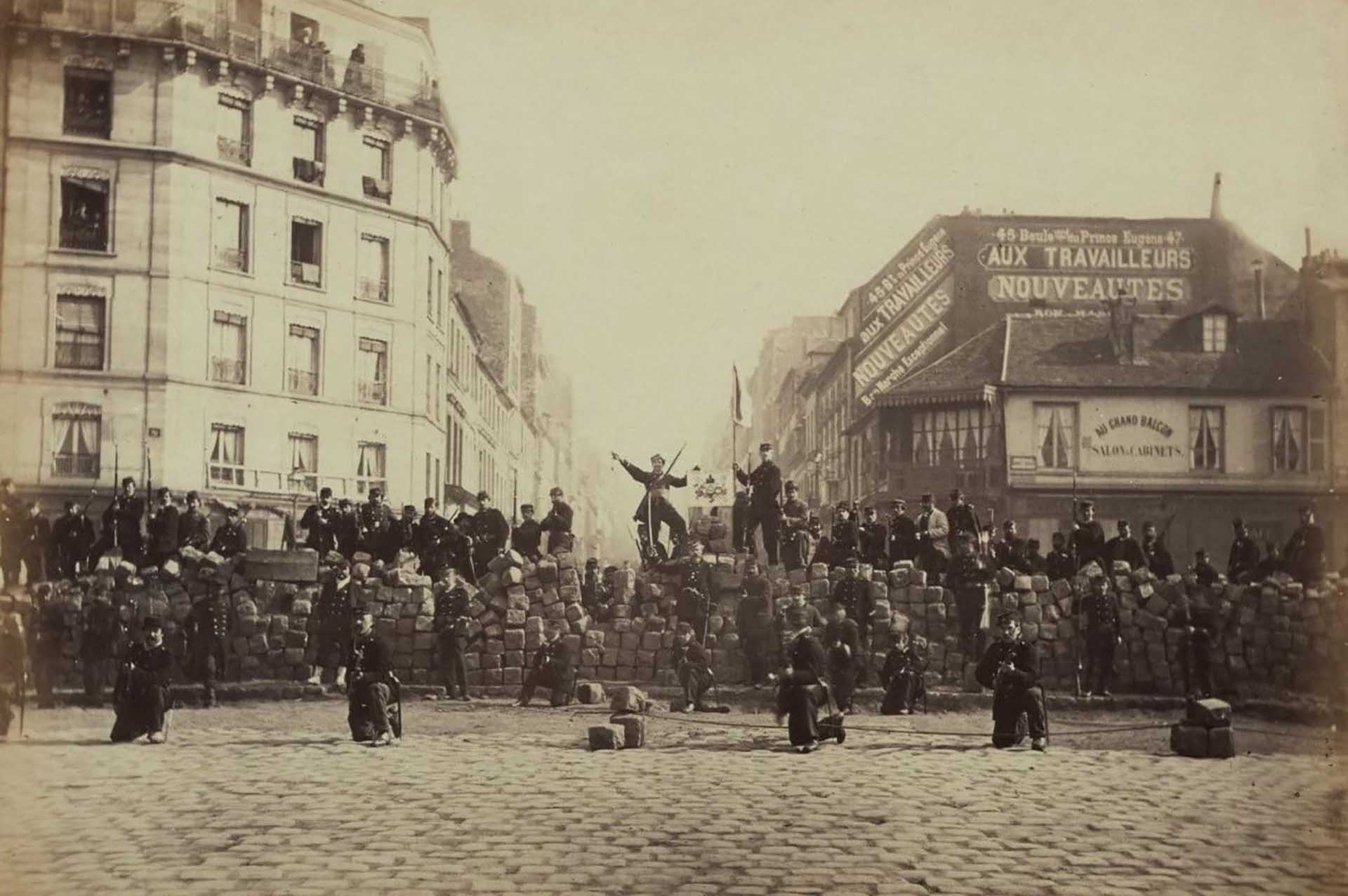
A barricade during the Paris Commune of 1871, which Marx analysed in The Civil War in France

In 1871, Marx wrote The Civil War in France, an analysis of and encomium for the Paris Commune. The text, which served as an address to the General Council of the First International, was an attempt by Marx to "set the record straight" on the Commune in the face of widespread condemnation. Although he was an "anti-utopian thinker" who generally avoided speculating on the form of a future communist society, the concrete example of the Commune led him to outline his views on revolutionary government. Marx praised the Commune's democratic institutions, which he saw as the blueprint for a workers' government: the replacement of the standing army with a people's militia; the election of municipal councillors by universal manhood suffrage who were responsible to their electorate and could be recalled; the payment of all public officials, from councillors to judges, at working-class wages; and the disestablishment of the church.

=== French edition of Capital and multilinearity ===
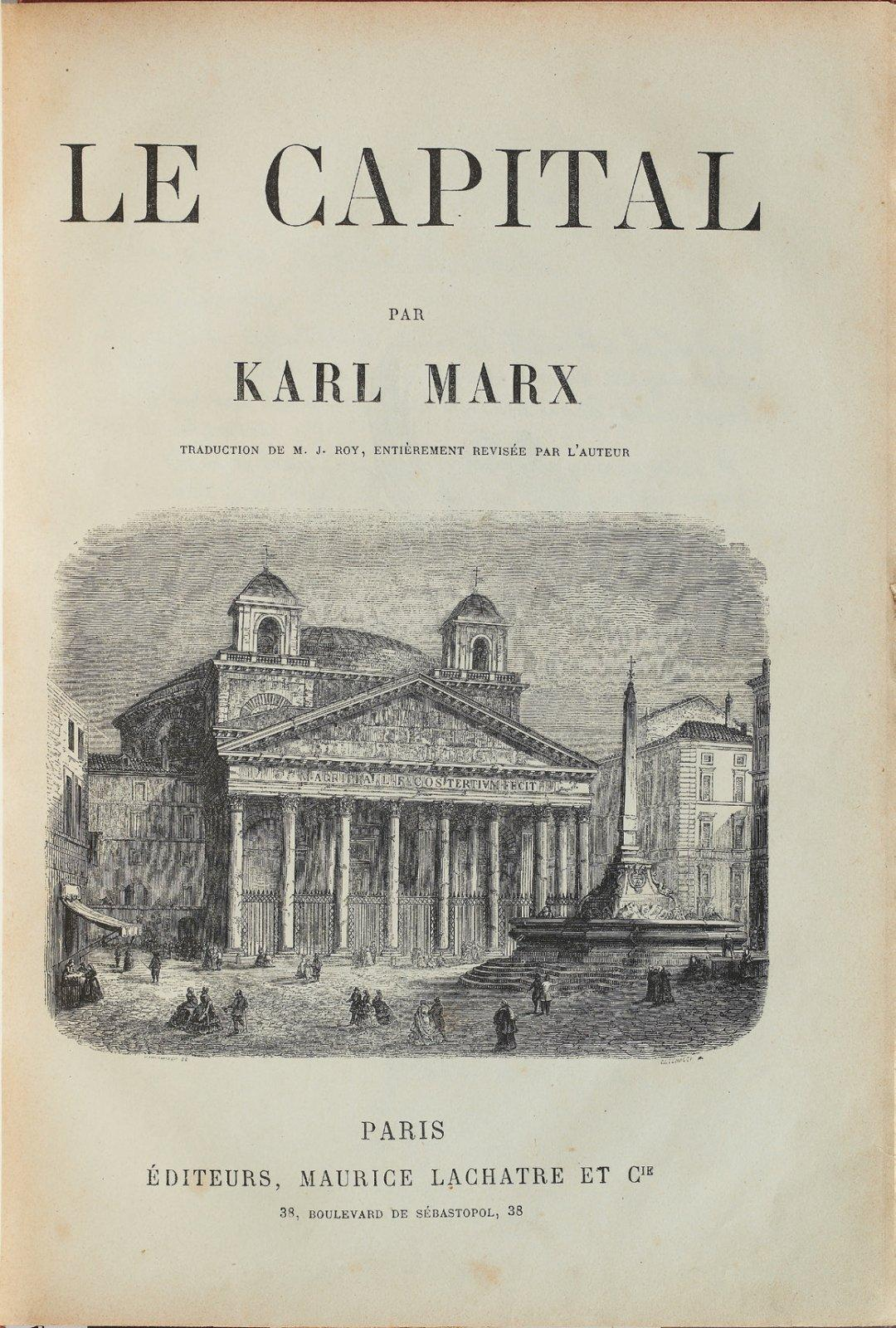
Title page of the 1875 French edition of Capital

Between 1872 and 1875, Marx dedicated significant time to preparing the French edition of Capital, the first translation of the book. He described this edition as having a "scientific value independent of the original," which he urged even German-speaking readers to consult. This task proved to be a "real slog," requiring him to rewrite large portions of the text and consuming time he had planned for other work. In this edition, Marx made several crucial revisions that limited the seemingly universal applicability of his theory of historical development.

In the preface to the first German edition (1867), a widely cited sentence stated: "The country that is more developed industrially only shows, to the less developed, the image of its own future." This was often interpreted as presenting England's path as a universal model for all societies. In the French edition, Marx altered the sentence to read: "The country that is more developed industrially only shows, to those that follow it up the industrial ladder, the image of its own future." This change explicitly excluded societies that had not yet embarked on a capitalist path, such as Russia and India, leaving open the possibility of alternative developmental trajectories.

A second, more explicit change was made in the chapter on "The Secret of Primitive Accumulation." In the German editions, Marx stated that the history of the expropriation of the peasantry "assumes different aspects in different countries, and runs through its various phases in different orders of succession ... Only in England, which we therefore take as our example, has it the classic form." In the French edition, Marx added a crucial clarification:

But the basis of this whole development is the expropriation of the cultivators. So far, it has been carried out in a radical manner only in England: therefore this country will necessarily play the leading role in our sketch. But all the countries of Western Europe are going through the same development...

This revision explicitly restricted his historical sketch of the origins of capitalism to "Western Europe," a point he would later emphasize in his correspondence on Russia.

=== Critique of the Gotha Programme ===
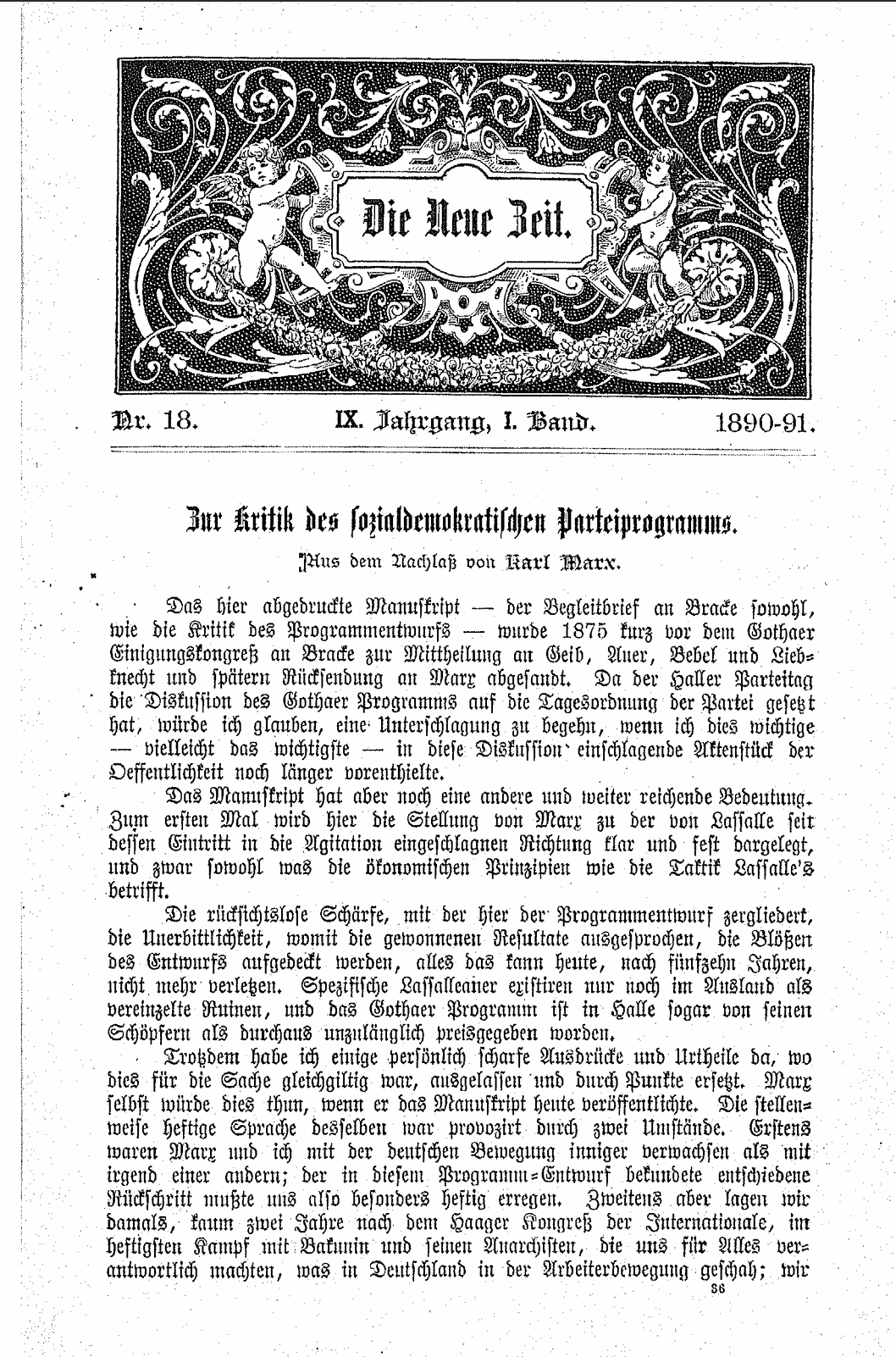
First page of the Critique of the Gotha Programme, written by Marx in 1875 and published posthumously by Engels in 1891

Marx's 1875 Critique of the Gotha Programme, a set of marginal notes on the unity programme of the German social-democratic parties, was another key text from this period. It was published posthumously by Engels in 1891. The work contains Marx's most extensive statements on the principles of a communist society and represents a sharp critique of liberal conceptions of rights. Marx argued that liberal 'rights' were "indissolubly connected with interests construed not just individualistically but egoistically." He posited that in a communist society, the need for a separate apparatus of enforcement would decline, as cooperative production would generate a "realm of individual interests in collectively beneficial relations" where disputes could be resolved differently.

=== Russia and an alternate path to communism ===
Marx's late work was deeply engaged with Russia. The 1872 Russian translation of Capital—its first translation into any language—was widely debated by Russian intellectuals, particularly the populists (Narodniki), who sought an agrarian, non-capitalist path to socialism. Marx's thinking on this subject was influenced by the work of the populist writer Nikolai Chernyshevsky, whose analysis suggested that a given social phenomenon did not need to pass through all the same "logical moments" in every society. In 1877, Marx drafted a response to an article by the populist writer Nikolai Mikhailovsky, who had interpreted Marx's theory as a "suprahistorical" philosophy of history that mandated all nations, including Russia, must pass through the stage of capitalism. Marx strongly rejected this interpretation, citing the revised French edition of Capital to argue that his sketch of primitive accumulation was explicitly limited to Western Europe. He wrote that one could never understand social development "with the master key of a general historico-philosophical theory, whose supreme virtue consists in being suprahistorical."

==== The Zasulich correspondence ====
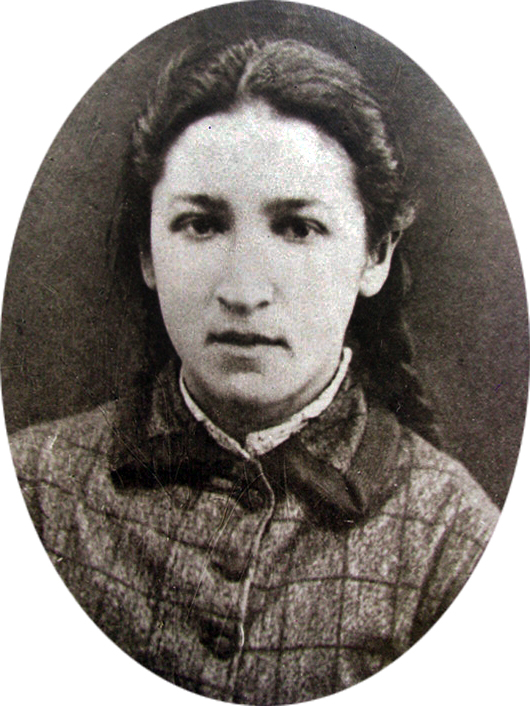
Vera Zasulich

In February 1881, the Russian revolutionary Vera Zasulich wrote to Marx, asking directly if Russia's rural commune (the obshchina or mir), an ancient form of collective land tenure, could "pass directly into the higher, communist form of communal ownership" or if it was "destined to perish" as Russia underwent capitalist development. Marx composed four lengthy preparatory drafts before sending a brief reply. The drafts show him grappling with the question in depth, drawing on his extensive anthropological research.

In the drafts, Marx argued that the Russian commune had a unique vitality compared to other pre-capitalist communal forms. Its "dualism"—the combination of communal land ownership with private household farming and appropriation of produce—created potential for both individual development and collective life. Crucially, the Russian commune was not an isolated, archaic society; it was "contemporaneous with capitalist production." This allowed it the possibility of appropriating "all its positive achievements" of capitalism—such as technology and the mechanisms of a global market—"without undergoing its hideous vicissitudes."

For this to happen, a revolution was necessary. The chief threats to the commune were not historical inevitability but "state oppression, and exploitation by capitalist intruders." A Russian revolution, Marx concluded, would have to "concentrate all its forces to ensure the unfettered rise of the rural commune." In his eventual, brief reply to Zasulich, Marx stated that his study of the matter had "convinced me that the commune is the fulcrum for Russia’s social regeneration."

This possibility was not, however, a theory of "socialism in one country." In the 1882 preface to the Russian edition of the Communist Manifesto, co-authored with Friedrich Engels, Marx linked Russia's fate to that of the West:

If the Russian revolution becomes the signal for a proletarian revolution in the West, so that the two complement each other, then the present Russian communal landownership may serve as the point of departure for a communist development.

=== The Ethnological Notebooks ===
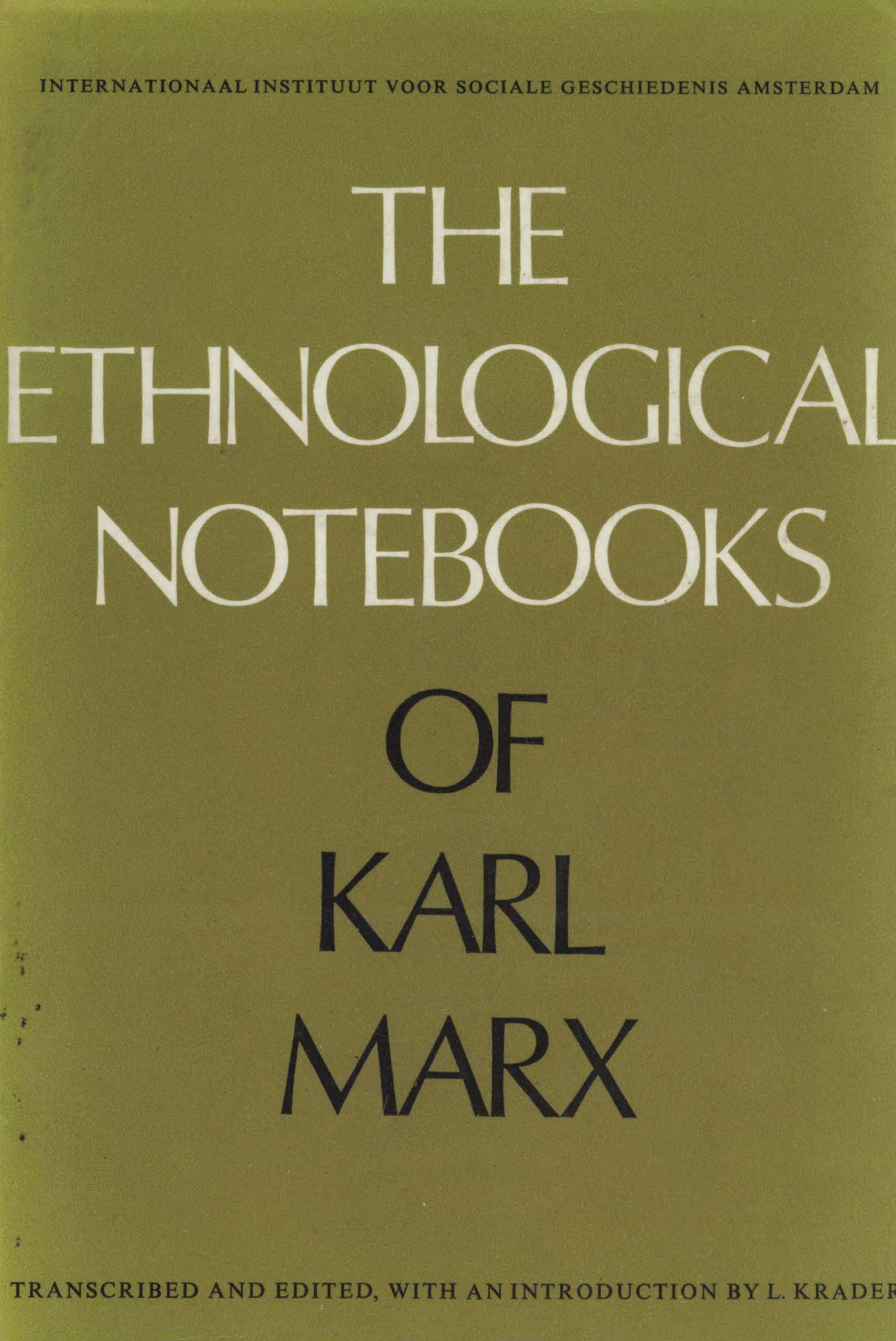
Cover of The Ethnological Notebooks, edited by Lawrence Krader and first published in 1972

Between 1879 and 1882, Marx filled numerous notebooks with excerpts and commentaries on anthropological and historical works, totaling over three hundred thousand words. These notebooks, many of which remain unpublished, cover a wide range of societies, including India, Indonesia, Algeria, Latin America, and ancient Rome, as well as pre-literate societies such as Native Americans and Australian Aborigines. The most well-known of these are The Ethnological Notebooks, compiled primarily between December 1880 and June 1881, and first published in 1972. They contain Marx's studies of Lewis H. Morgan, John Budd Phear, Henry Sumner Maine, and John Lubbock.

==== Gender and the clan ====
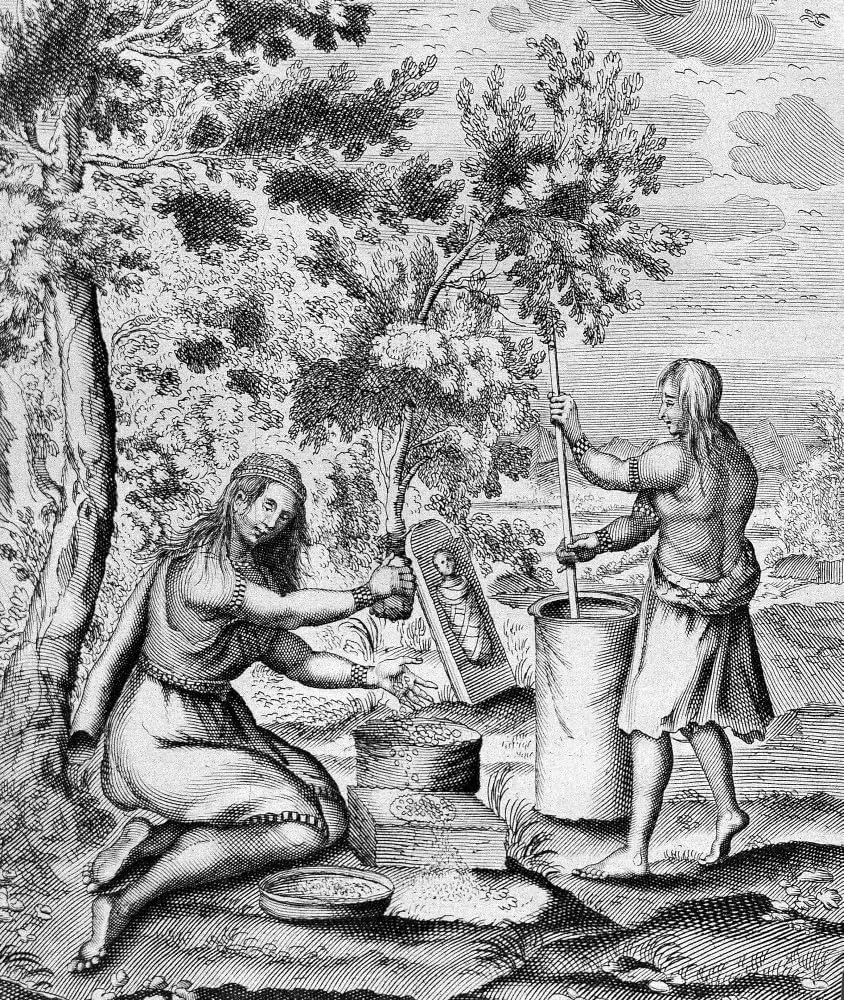
Depiction of Iroquois women at work, 1664

Marx's notes on Morgan's Ancient Society show a deep interest in the social structure of the Iroquois and other pre-literate societies. He was particularly attentive to the relatively egalitarian gender relations within the clan (or gens), noting the significant social power wielded by women. For example, he highlighted a missionary's account that Iroquois "women were the great power among the clans" and could depose chiefs. However, unlike Engels, who in The Origin of the Family, Private Property and the State (1884) presented a somewhat idealized picture of early clan societies, Marx also noted the "limitations" on women's freedom, such as the fact that they were "allowed to express their wishes and opinions" but the final "Decision [was] given by the [male] Council."

Anderson argues that Marx's notes show a more nuanced and dialectical view than Engels's theory of a singular "world-historical defeat of the female sex." Marx's notes on classical Greece, for instance, portray male domination as a contradictory phenomenon, where the memory of an "earlier, freer and more powerful position for women" was preserved in the mythology of goddesses like Hera and Athena. He also noted that social hierarchy could emerge within the clan itself, long before the rise of private property, through conquest or the rigidification of rank into caste.

==== India, colonialism, and communal forms ====
Depiction of the Sepoy Uprising in India, 1857

Marx's extensive notebooks on India from 1879–81, based on the works of anthropologist Maxim Kovalevsky, ethnologist John Budd Phear, and historian Robert Sewell, show a profound shift from his writings of the 1850s. He no longer viewed India as a static, unchanging society. Following Kovalevsky, he traced the historical evolution of communal forms in India, from early clan-based communities to more differentiated village communes. He vehemently rejected the application of the concept of "feudalism" to pre-colonial India, criticizing Kovalevsky for mis-applying "the West European sense of the term." His notes on Sewell's history emphasize moments of Indian resistance to foreign conquest, such as the Maratha resistance and the Sepoy Uprising, challenging his earlier view of Indian "passivity." He also noted the relative porosity of the caste system in pre-colonial India, again moving away from his earlier, more rigid characterization, and the prominent role of women rebels like Lakshmi Bai in the 1857 uprising.

Marx was deeply critical of the impact of British colonialism. He attacked writers like Henry Sumner Maine, whom he saw as an apologist for empire, for presenting the destruction of Indian communal property as the natural result of "economic progress," when it was in fact the result of violent colonial policy. Marx described this process as an act of "English vandalism which drove the indigenous population backward rather than forward." He argued, in an insertion into his notes on Kovalevsky, that even after British rule had shattered the traditional village system and atomized its members, "Nevertheless among these atoms certain relationships endure," suggesting a persistence that could serve as a basis for resistance.

==== Algeria and Latin America ====
In his notes on Kovalevsky's work on Algeria, Marx analyzed the French colonial project to dismantle communal land ownership. He quoted with approval the argument of French legislators that the maintenance of communal property "supports communistic tendencies in peoples minds," seeing a direct link between the state's efforts to impose private property in the colonies and its suppression of working-class movements in France, such as the Paris Commune. He also studied the Spanish colonization of the Americas, noting the brutal imposition of forced labor systems (the repartimiento and encomienda) and the extermination of indigenous populations, followed by the rise of the African slave trade. He noted, however, that communal forms in Latin America survived to a greater degree than in British India, because Spanish colonial legislation had created fewer avenues for the privatization and sale of communal lands.

=== Notes on Adolph Wagner ===
One of the last substantial works Marx penned before his death was his 1880 Notes on Adolph Wagner, a critique of the German political economist Adolph Wagner. In these notes, Marx challenged static conceptions of human nature, arguing against any fixed concept of 'man' in political theory. Instead, he insisted that his own starting point was "always a fully historical and exceptionally malleable view of 'man,' subject only to constraints that were themselves variable with respect to what 'man' had become and what 'man' was trying to do."

=== Chronological Extracts and historical studies ===
Between autumn 1881 and winter 1882, following the death of his wife, Marx immersed himself in historical studies, compiling four large notebooks known as the Chronological Extracts. These notebooks consist of an annotated, year-by-year timeline of world history from approximately 91 BC to the Peace of Westphalia in 1648. The work drew primarily on the World History for the German People by Friedrich Christoph Schlosser and the History of the Peoples of Italy by Carlo Botta.

The notebooks cover a vast range of topics, including the fall of the Roman Empire, the rise of France, the development of feudalism, the Italian maritime republics, the Islamic conquest of Africa and the East, the Crusades, the Mongol Empire, the Republic of Florence, and the Protestant Reformation. According to biographer Marcello Musto, this intensive study of the past was an attempt by Marx to test his historical conceptions and move definitively beyond the unilinear schema of modes of production he had outlined in his 1859 A Contribution to the Critique of Political Economy.

== Difficulties in completing Capital ==
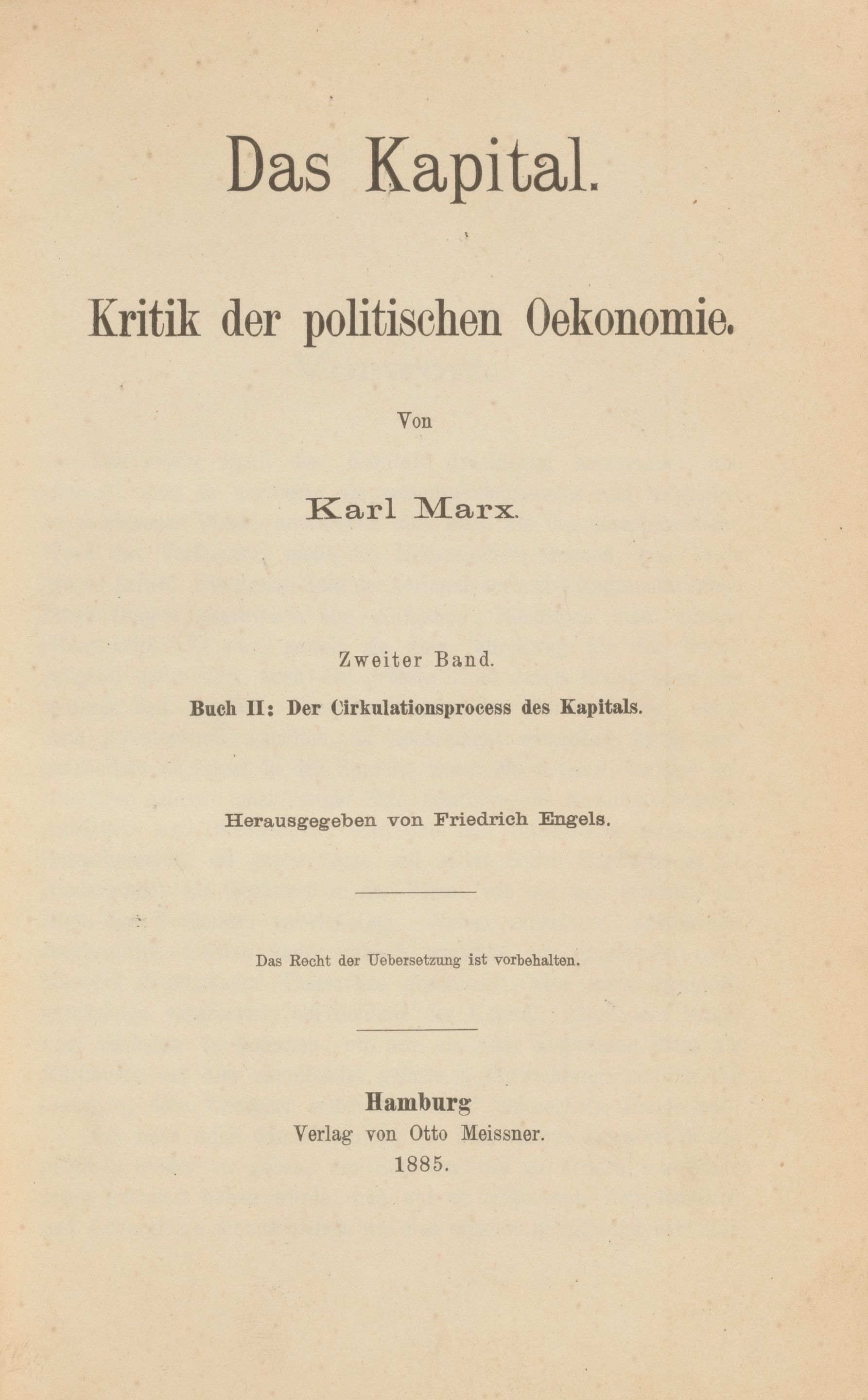
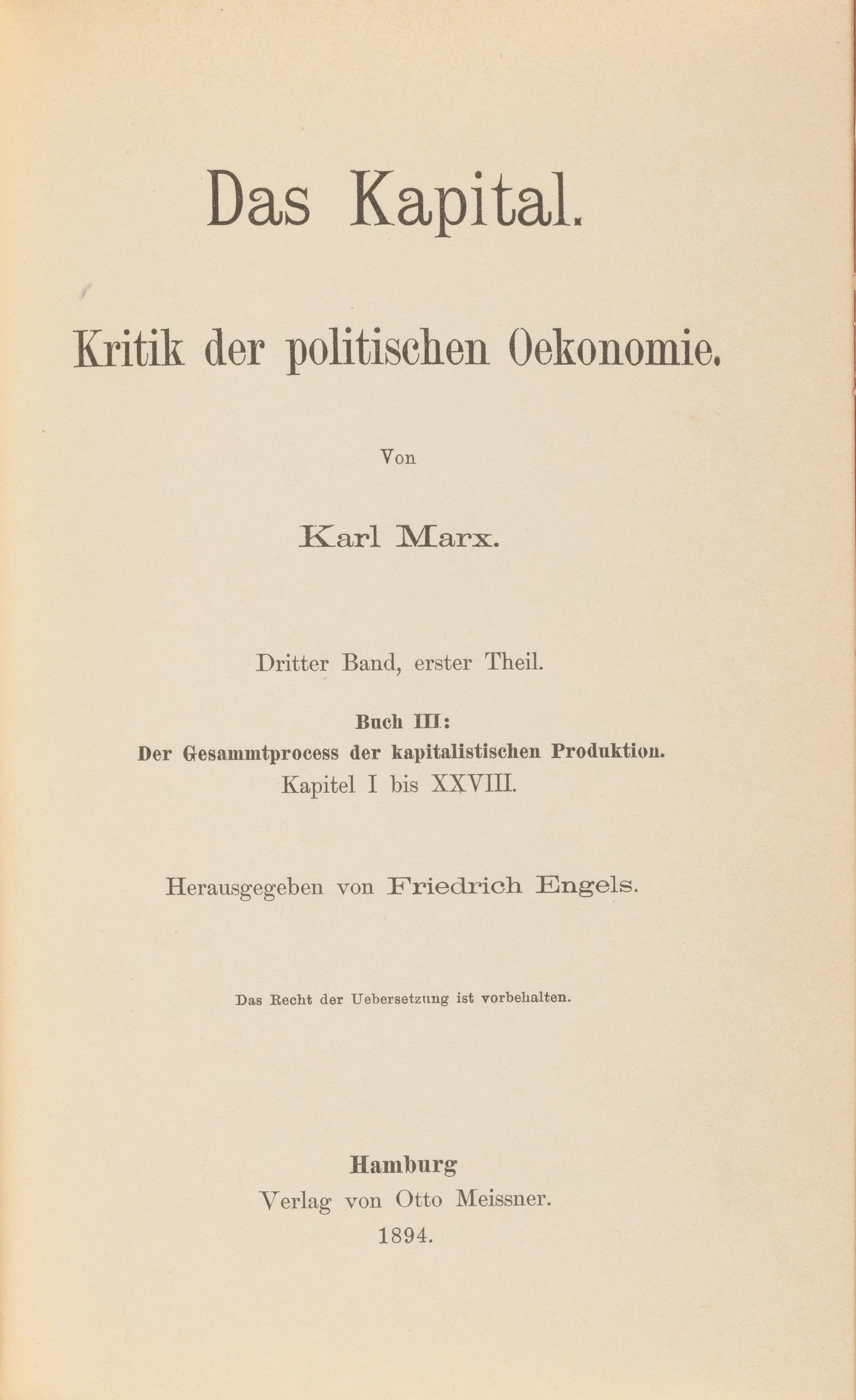
Title pages of Volume II (1885) and Volume III (1894) of Capital, published posthumously by Friedrich Engels

Marx was unable to complete Capital, Volume II and Volume III in his lifetime, and the scholarly consensus is that a number of factors contributed to this. The first was his persistent ill health. From the late 1870s on, he suffered from chronic insomnia, bronchitis, and pleurisy, which severely limited his ability to work and forced him to take long periods of rest.

Second, Marx's scholarly rigor and self-criticism led him to continually expand his research. Rather than finishing the existing manuscripts, he saw a need for a "fresh appraisal" of new economic developments, particularly in the United States and Russia, which were assuming greater importance than he had foreseen in the 1860s. His studies expanded to include new data on joint-stock companies, the global impact of railways, the money market, and banking, as well as natural sciences such as geology and chemistry.

Finally, a significant amount of his time in the 1870s and early 1880s was consumed by the revisions of previous work. He spent nearly three years on the 1872–75 French edition of Volume I, which he substantially rewrote. In late 1881, just before his wife's death, he was again forced to set aside work on Volume II to prepare the third German edition of Volume I.

== Political engagement and international affairs ==
Despite his failing health and focus on scholarly research, Marx remained a close observer of world politics in his final years. He corresponded with socialist movements across Europe and commented on major global events. In 1881, responding to a query from the Dutch socialist Ferdinand Domela Nieuwenhuis about the legislative measures a future revolutionary government should take, Marx rejected the request as a "fallacious problem". He reiterated his long-held opposition to "writing recipes ... for the cook-shops of the future," arguing that the specific actions of a revolutionary government would depend "entirely on the actual historical circumstances".

He also commented on political and economic developments in Britain, the US, and Ireland. He was a sharp critic of William Gladstone's Irish policies and a firm supporter of Irish independence. He analyzed the theories of the American economist Henry George, dismissing his "single tax" proposal as "merely an attempt, tricked out with socialism, to save the capitalist régime." He strongly condemned the 1882 British invasion of Egypt, calling it a blatant example of "Christian hypocrisy" and mocking British bourgeois politicians "who groan as they assume more and more 'responsibilities' in the service of their historic mission." During this period, exasperated by the doctrinaire interpretations of his work by some of his French followers, including his son-in-law Paul Lafargue, Marx famously quipped: "What is certain is that I am not a Marxist" (Ce qu’il y a de certain c’est que moi, je ne suis pas Marxiste).

== Personal life and final years (1881–1883) ==
Marx's wife, Jenny Marx, was diagnosed with liver cancer and died on 2 December 1881. Marx was himself suffering from a severe case of pleurisy and bronchitis at the time and was forbidden by his doctor from attending her funeral.

On his doctor's advice, Marx spent the next eight months seeking a climate conducive to his recovery. In February 1882, he travelled to Algiers in French-ruled Algeria, the only time in his life he spent outside Europe. The trip was a failure; the weather was unusually cold and rainy, and he suffered from another attack of pleurisy. Deeply lonely and suffering from the "enforced lack of serious intellectual activity," he wrote to Engels of his "profound melancholy, like the great Don Quixote." He also made a number of observations on Arab society, noting the "absolute equality" of social intercourse among Muslims but concluding that "they will go to rack and ruin without a revolutionary movement." Before leaving Algiers, he had his photograph taken, which became the last image of him.

His journey continued to Monte Carlo, where he was unimpressed by the casino culture, and then to Paris and Argenteuil to stay with his daughter Jenny Longuet. In the summer of 1882 he spent several months in Switzerland, staying in Lausanne and Vevey. His health remained poor, and his spirits were broken by a final tragedy: the death of Jenny on 11 January 1883, likely from bladder cancer. Too grief-stricken to continue, Marx returned to London, where his health rapidly declined. He developed a lung abscess and died of heart failure on 14 March 1883. Engels, arriving at his house, found him "sleeping, never to wake again."

== Scholarly interpretation and legacy ==
The interpretation of Marx's late writings has been a subject of considerable debate. For much of the 20th century, the dominant view, influenced by figures like David Riazanov, the first editor of the Marx-Engels-Gesamtausgabe (MEGA), was that Marx was in a period of intellectual decline in his final years. Riazanov characterized the late notebooks as "inexcusable pedantry" and argued that after 1878, Marx was largely unable to do serious theoretical work. This view, which Anderson calls an expression of the "Eurocentrism" of early 20th-century Marxism, contributed to the long-standing neglect of these texts.

The publication of the Grundrisse in 1939 and The Ethnological Notebooks in 1972 spurred a reassessment. Scholars like Lawrence Krader, the editor of the notebooks, and Raya Dunayevskaya were among the first to argue that these late writings were not a sign of decline but a significant new direction in Marx's thought. Dunayevskaya emphasized the notebooks' focus on gender and their challenge to the economic determinism of later Marxism, including that of Engels. This perspective has gained wider acceptance since the 1980s. Scholars like Teodor Shanin, in his influential volume Late Marx and the Russian Road, argued that Marx's late work on Russia constituted a radical break with the "unilinear determinism" of his earlier writings.

Anderson argues that the late writings show Marx developing a "multilinear and non-reductionist theory of history," moving beyond a singular model of development and revolution. He sees a continuous evolution from Marx's critique of colonialism in the 1850s to his late work, rather than a sharp break. This late turn, Anderson contends, shows Marx's critique of capital to be "far broader than is usually supposed," encompassing a deep analysis of non-Western societies, nationalism, race, and ethnicity. This re-evaluation has placed the late Marx at the center of contemporary debates on postcolonialism, multiculturalism, and critiques of Eurocentrism.

== See also ==
- Historical materialism
- Young Marx
