= Krader =

Krader can refer to:

- Krader, a character from the Mixels franchise
- Lawrence Krader, an important American socialist anthropologist and ethnologist
- Sherman Krader, a character from the movie Ernest Goes to Camp
