= Internationale Marx-Engels-Stiftung =

Association that publishes the collected works of Karl Marx and Friedrich Engels

The Internationale Marx-Engels-Stiftung (IMES) or the International Marx-Engels Foundation, is an international scientific network, founded in 1990 on the initiative of the International Institute of Social History (IISH) in Amsterdam. The purpose of the foundation is to publish a historical-critical complete edition of the works of Karl Marx and Friedrich Engels (Marx-Engels-Gesamtausgabe – MEGA). The Foundation published the MEGA-Studien as a journal to accompany the complete edition, and from 2003 the Marx-Engels-Jahrbuch as a forum for Marx-Engels research.

In addition to the Amsterdame Institut (IISH), die Berlin-Brandenburg Academy of Science (BBAW), the Karl Marx House (KMH) the Friedrich Ebert Foundation in Trier, the „Russian State Archive of Socio-Political History“ (RGA) and the “Independent Russian Institute for the Study of Social and National Problems” (RNI), both based in Moscow, are involved. The Foundation's work is supported by a multi-member international scientific advisory board and teams from several countries.

== Structure ==
The bodies of the International Marx-Engels Foundation are:

- Beatrix Bouvier (Trier)
- Herfried Münkler (Berlin)
- Oleg Naumow (Moskau)
- Erik-Jan Zürcher (Amsterdam)
- Michael Quante (Münster)

Formerly on the management board:

- Kirill Anderson
- Dieter Dowe
- Jaap Klostermann
- Marcel van der Linden
- Hans Pelger
- Andrej Sorokin

=== Editorial commission ===
- Georgii A. Bagaturiia (Moskau)
- Beatrix Bouvier (Trier)
- Fangguo Chai
- Galina D. Golovina (Moskau)
- Lex Heerma van Voss (Amsterdam)
- Jürgen Herres (Berlin)
- Gerald Hubmann (Berlin)
- Götz Langkau (Amsterdam)
- Manfred Neuhaus (Berlin)
- Izumi Omura (Sendai)
- Teinosuke Otani (Tokio)
- Fred E. Schrader (Paris)
- Ljudmila L. Vasina (Moskau)
- Carl-Erich Vollgraf (Berlin)
- Wei Jianhua (Beijing)

Formerly in the editorial department:

- Elena Aržanova
- Jacques Grandjonc
- Martin Hundt
- Jürgen Rojahn
- Fred Schrader
- Vitalij Vygodskij
- Terrell Carver (Bristol)
- Timm Graßmann
- Claudia Reichel

=== Scientific Advisory Board ===
- Andreas Arndt
- Shlomo Avineri (Jerusalem)
- Harald Bluhm
- Warren Breckman
- Gerd Callesen (Wien)
- Patrik Fridenson (Paris)
- Carlos B. Gutiérrez (Bogotá)
- Hans-Peter Harstick (Wolfenbüttel)
- Rahel Jaeggi
- Hermann Klenner (Berlin)
- Jürgen Kocka (Berlin)
- Nikolai I. Lapin (Moskau)
- Hermann Lübbe (Zürich)
- Teodor I. Oizerman (Moskau)
- Bertell Ollman (New York)
- Michael Quante
- Pedro Ribas (Madrid)
- Bertram Schefold (Frankfurt/Main)
- Wolfgang Schieder (Köln)
- Hans Schilar (Berlin)
- Walter Schmidt (Berlin)
- Gareth Stedman Jones (Cambridge)
- Shiro Sugihara (Osaka)
- Immanuel Wallerstein (Paris/Binghamton, New York)
- Jianhua Wei (Peking)

Formerly on the Advisory Board:

- Robert E. Cazden
- Iring Fetscher (Frankfurt/M.)
- Eric J. Fischer (Bussum, Niederlande)
- Francesca Gori (Mailand)
- Andrzej F. Grabski (Lodz)
- Eric Hobsbawm (London)
- Michael Knieriem (Wuppertal)
- Mikhail P. Mchedlov (Moskau)
- Tsutomu Ouchi (Tokio)
- Jean Stengers (Brüssel)
- Toshiro Sugimoto
- Ferenc Tökei
- Zhou Liangxun
