= Fred E. Schrader =

Fred E. Schrader (1948–2026) was a German historian and social scientist whose research on unpublished manuscripts traced the development of Karl Marx's political economy. His work also contributed to the historiography of the French Revolution and the study of the formation of modern civil society.

== Biography ==
Born in Hanover in 1948 as the son of the Latvian Therese Eglit and the businessman Friedrich Schrader, he spent his childhood and youth in Nienburg, Bremen, Munich and Bielefeld. After graduating from the Ratsgymnasium in Bielefeld, he began his studies in 1968 in Marburg and Göttingen, first in medicine, before switching to the social sciences. He earned his doctorate in philosophy in 1978 at Philipps University in Marburg. In 1990, he completed his habilitation in modern history at the University of Kassel. From 1974 to 1986, he conducted research as a research officer at the International Institute of Social History in Amsterdam (IISG). He lived and worked in Paris from 1986. From 1986 to 1989, he held a research scholarship at the Maison des Sciences de L'Homme in Paris (MSH/EHESS). He then held visiting professorships before being appointed a professor at the University of Paris VIII in 1995. From 2012 to 2018, he also taught European history at Fudan University in Shanghai. Subsequently, he lived in Paris and Arcachon as an emeritus professor.

== Research ==
His research focused on the history of Stalinism in the 1930s, the Netherlands in the 17th and 18th centuries, Western European Enlightenment sociability, political economy from the 17th to the 19th centuries, the dual history of the Ancien Régime and the Holy Roman Empire, as well as that of the Second Empire and Third Republic and the German Empire, the historiography of the Revolution, and, more generally, the formation of modern Western civil society as societas civilis from the 16th to the 21st centuries. His work drew on previously unexplored, relevant primary sources. Karl Marx's unpublished working notebooks from the 1850s and 1860s, held at the IISG in Amsterdam, helped shape his research. From 1990, he participated in the relaunch of the historical-critical edition of the complete works of Marx and Engels (MEGA²), within the framework of the International Marx-Engels Foundation (IMES). He was a member of its editorial committee from 1993 to 2012. He received several awards and distinctions, including the Spinozapenning in 1985 and the Prix Bordin of the Académie des sciences morales et politiques in 1993.

The central questions of his research concerned specific functional relationships among “social facts” (Durkheim) in Western Europe from the early modern period onwards. His research aimed to contribute to a history of the formation of civil society as a “system”, as conceived by, among others, Grotius, Hobbes, Rousseau, Hegel and Marx.

== Reception ==
Paul Mattick Jr. drew on Restauration und Revolution in his discussion of Marx's theory of money, adopting Schrader's account of the role of Hegelian categories in its presentation.

In his study of the historiography of the French Revolution, Antonino De Francesco described Augustin Cochin et la République française as the most important biography of Cochin.

Brigitte Studer and Berthold Unfried discussed Der Moskauer Prozeß 1936 in their survey of research on the Comintern and Stalinism, focusing on its analysis of enemy images as explanations for disorder within the Soviet system.

== Selected publications ==
- With Ursula Schrader-Wälke: Schulreform in den Westzonen. Achenbach, Gießen, 1974. ISBN 3-87958-116-9.
- Restauration und Revolution. Die Vorarbeiten zum „Kapital“ von Karl Marx in seinen Studienheften 1850–1858. Gerstenberg, Hildesheim, 1980. ISBN 3-8067-0861-4.
- Augustin Cochin et la République française. Seuil, Paris, 1992. ISBN 2-02-010275-7.
- Der Moskauer Prozeß 1936. Zur Sozialgeschichte eines politischen Feindbildes. Campus, Frankfurt am Main, 1995. ISBN 3-593-35287-7.
- Die Formierung der bürgerlichen Gesellschaft, 1550–1850. Fischer-Taschenbuch-Verlag, Frankfurt am Main, 1996. ISBN 3-596-60133-9.
- L’Allemagne avant l’État-nation. Le corps germanique, 1648–1806. Presses universitaires de France, Paris, 1998. ISBN 2-13-049516-8.
- With Chen Lemin (陈乐民): 对话欧洲 (Conversations on Europe). 三联书店, 2009. ISBN 978-7-108-03133-4.
- Zur politischen Semantik der Revolution. Frankreich (1750–1850). VS Verlag für Sozialwissenschaften, Wiesbaden, 2011. ISBN 978-3-531-17673-4.
