= Barbara Lattimer Krader =

American ethnomusicologist

- Barbara Lattimer Krader, from a 1955 newspaper
- Born: Barbara Anne Lattimer; January 15, 1922; Columbus, Ohio
- Died: March 29, 2007 (aged 85); Marion, Oregon
- Occupations: Ethnomusicologist, translator, librarian, educator
- Spouse: Lawrence Krader (m. 1953)

Barbara Anne Lattimer Krader (January 15, 1922 – March 29, 2007) was an American ethnomusicologist, translator, librarian, and educator. She was the first woman to be elected president of the Society for Ethnomusicology (SEM), serving her term from 1972 to 1973.

== Early life and education ==
Lattimer was born in Columbus, Ohio, the daughter of Gardner Lattimer and Esther Reese Williams Lattimer. Her father worked in a metal parts factory and was coordinator at a hospital. She graduated from Vassar College in 1942, and was active in the school's "Composers Club" as a student.

Lattimer earned a master's degree from Columbia University in 1948, and studied at Prague University from 1948 to 1949. She earned a Ph.D. in Slavic languages and literature at Radcliffe College in 1955, under Russian linguist Roman Jakobson, with a dissertation titled "Serbian peasant wedding ritual songs: A formal, semantic and functional analysis."

== Career ==
During her doctoral work, she traveled in Yugoslavia on a fellowship from the American Association of University Women (AAUW), teaching English classes for the State Department and collecting folksongs. She worked in the music department of the Pan-American Union in the late 1950s.

From 1959 to 1963, Lattimer was a reference librarian in the Slavonic division of the Library of Congress. She taught at Ohio State University from 1963 to 1964. She was based in London as executive secretary of the International Folk Music Council from 1965 to 1966. In 1970, she taught a course on folk music at Conrad Grebel College in Ontario. From 1972 to 1973, she was the first woman to be elected president of the Society for Ethnomusicology.

In 1985, she was the first woman to give the Charles Seeger Memorial Lecture to the annual meeting of the Society for Ethnomusicology, when she gave a speech titled "Slavic Folk Music: Forms of Singing and Self-Identity.” Under the difficult conditions of the Cold War, she was recognized for her efforts to maintain contacts between music scholars on both sides of the Iron Curtain.

== Publications ==
- "Slavica: Czechoslovakia and Poland" (1962, with Janina W. Hoskins)
- "Soviet Research on Russian Music" (1963)
- "The Glagolitic Missal of 1483" (1963)
- "Viktor Mikhailovich Beliaev" (1968)
- "Bulgarian Folk Music Research" (1969)
- "The Russian Protiazhnaia 'Prolonged' Folk Song" (1969, with Viktor M. Beliaev)
- "Folk Music in Soviet Russia: Some Recent Publications" (1970)
- "Vasil Stoin, Bulgarian Folk Song Collector" (1980)
- "Ethnomusicology" (1980, entry in The New Grove Dictionary of Music and Musicians)
- "Slavic Folk Music: Forms of Singing and Self-Identity" (1987)
- "Recent Achievements in Soviet Ethnomusicology, with Remarks on Russian Terminology" (1990)

== Personal life ==
Lattimer married anthropologist Lawrence Krader in 1953. She died in 2007, in Marion, Oregon, at the age of 85.
