= Marcello Musto =

Italian-Canadian professor, Karl Marx historian

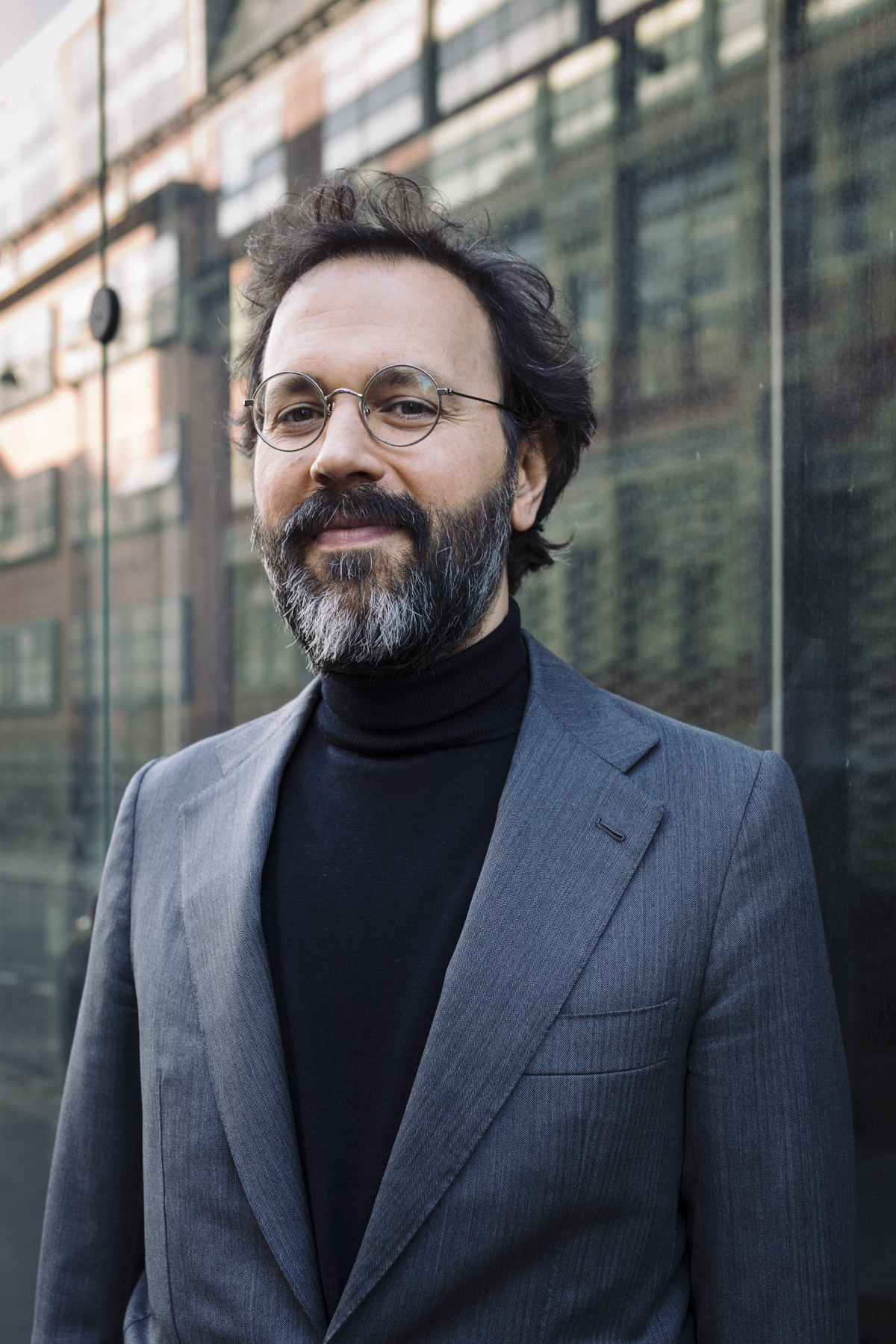
- Born: April 14, 1976 (age 50); Naples, Italy
- Title: Professor

Academic background
- Education: University of Naples "L'Orientale"; University of Nice Sophia Antipolis
- Thesis: Karl Marx’s 'Economic and Philosophical Manuscripts of 1844'. Philological Examination, Critical Theory, Vicissitudes of Publication (2006)
- Influences: Karl Marx

Academic work
- Discipline: Political Science, Sociology, Philosophy
- Institutions: York University
- Main interests: History of political thought, Political theory, Intellectual history, Sociological theory, Political philosophy
- Website: www.marcellomusto.org

Marcello Musto (born 14 April 1976) is a professor of sociology, and the founding director of the Laboratory for Alternative Theories, at York University in Canada. He is acknowledged globally as one of the authors who has made significant contributions to the revival of Marx studies over the last decade, and his research interests also include Socialist thought, the history of labour movement, and alternative socioeconomic systems. He is the author of The Last Years of Karl Marx: An Intellectual Biography and his major writings comprise four single-authored books, twelve edited volumes, and more than 50 journal articles and books chapters. His work has been translated worldwide in twenty-five languages.

== Education and career ==
Marcello Musto received a B.A. and M.A. in political science, and a Ph.D. degree in philosophy and politics, from the University of Naples "L'Orientale". He also earned a Ph.D. degree in philosophy from the University of Nice Sophia Antipolis, under the supervision of André Tosel.

He was appointed assistant professor of sociological theory, at the department of sociology of York University, in 2014. He was promoted to associate professor in 2016 and professor in 2020. He has held a number of visiting appointments around the world, including the University of Pisa, University of Helsinki, Rikkyo University, Fondation Maison des Sciences de l'Homme, and Sapienza University of Rome, and is a permanent adjunct professor at the Department of Philosophy of Nanjing University. His research has been supported by funding agencies from seven countries, including a Partnership Development Grant on "The Global History of Karl Marx's Capital" granted by the Social Sciences and Humanities Research Council of Canada.

Musto has disseminated his ideas at 150 invited lectures and presentations at conferences, in more than 20 countries. He contributes regularly to several daily and online newspapers, including The Statesman, Corriere della Sera, il manifesto, La Razón, BirGün, and Jacobin. He is also the editor of the book series Marx, Engels, Marxisms at Palgrave Macmillan and Critiques and Alternatives to Capitalism at Routledge.

== Scholarly work ==
In Another Marx: Early Manuscripts to the International (2018) Musto uses the most recent textual acquisitions of the Marx-Engels-Gesamtausgabe edition, to which he has dedicated several essays, to provide a critical re-examination of Marx's ideas on post-Hegelian philosophy, the materialist conception of history, research methods, working-class self-emancipation, and revolutionary theory. Divided in three parts – "Intellectual Influences and Early Writings", "The Critique of Political Economy", and "Political Militancy" – the book underlines the gulf between Marx's critical theory and the dogmatism of many Marxisms of the twentieth century. This work provides an original account of Marx's continued engagement with political economy and of his political commitments, from his younger years to the International Workingmen's Association.

The Last Years of Karl Marx: An Intellectual Biography (2020) is a reassessment of Marx's theoretical insights from the final, mostly unexplored, years of his life. Focusing on the period 1881-1883, Musto dispels the myth that Marx ceased to write late in life, and challenges the long-standing misrepresentation of Marx as a Eurocentric and economistic thinker who was fixated on class conflict alone. Musto argues that in this period Marx extended his research to new disciplines, political conflicts, theoretical issues and geographical areas, and demonstrates that he studied recent anthropological discoveries, analyzed communal forms of ownership in precapitalist societies, supported the struggle of the populist movement in Russia, and expressed critiques of colonial oppression in India, Ireland, Algeria and Egypt. For Musto, from Marx's late unpublished, or previously neglected manuscripts and notebooks, emerge an author markedly different from the one represented by many of his contemporary critics and followers alike.

Among Musto's numerous edited volumes, four have been particularly praised for their rigor and high level of scholarship. Karl Marx's Grundrisse: Foundations of the Critique of Political Economy 150 Years Later (2008) is considered to be one of the most complete references to Marx's best-known preparatory manuscript of Capital, the Grundrisse. The book demonstrates the relevance of the unfinished manuscript written between 1857 and 1858 to an understanding of Capital and analyzes why the various reflections on matters that Marx did not develop elsewhere in his oeuvre are important for an overall comprehension of his thought. Musto and various international experts in the field also highlight the continuing explanatory power of Marxian categories for contemporary society. The third part of this collection, dedicated to the "Dissemination and Reception of Grundrisse in the World ", reconstructs the history of all the translations and interpretations of this text and has been described as an example of "wonderful scholarly madness". This book was followed by two other collective volumes – Marx's Capital after 150 Years: Critique and Alternative to Capitalism (2019) and Marx and 'Le Capital': Evaluation, History, Reception (2022) –, completing a trilogy devoted to the making of Marx's Capital.

Workers Unite! The International 150 Years Later (2014) is the first anthology ever made of the addresses, resolutions, and documents of the International Workingmen's Association. In his lengthy introduction to this book, Musto illustrates the foundations of labour movement history and presents the life of the "First International" differently from the ideological orthodoxy of Marxism-Leninism: not merely a creation of Marx but a complex organization with multiple tendencies contending for political hegemony. For Musto, "the International helped workers to grasp that the emancipation of labour could not be won in a single country but was a global objective. It also spread awareness in their ranks that they had to achieve the goal themselves, through their own capacity for organization, rather than by delegating it to some other force; and that it was essential to overcome the capitalist mode of production and wage labour, since improvements within the existing system, though necessary to pursue, would not eliminate dependence on employers' oligarchies".

The Marx Revival: Key Concepts and New Interpretations (2020) highlights the relevance of Marx through 22 chapters by some of the world's leading contemporary Marxist scholars. They indicate the areas where Marx's theory requires most updating, as a result of changes since his times, and the reasons why it is still so relevant today. In the book's preface, Musto declares that research advances, together with the changed political conditions, suggest that the renewal in the interpretation of Marx's thought is a phenomenon destined to continue. In his own chapter "Communism", he argues that in his vision of post-capitalist society, "Marx attached a fundamental value to individual freedom, and his communism was radically different from the levelling of classes envisaged by many of his predecessors or from the political and economic uniformity pursued by many of his epigones".

One of Musto's most recent books is the anthology Karl Marx's Writings on Alienation (2021). In the introduction to this volume, he argues that many authors who have written on alienation have erroneously based their interpretations on Marx's early writings. By contrast, Musto focuses his analysis on what he calls the "second generation" of Marx's writings on alienation, i.e., the parts dedicated to this concept in the Grundrisse and in "Capital, Volume I: Book 1, Chapter VI, Unpublished", and considers that Marx's ideas comprised in his later economic works were far more extensive and resourceful than those of the early philosophical manuscripts. For Musto the diffusion of these theories not only paved the way for a notion of alienation different from the one hegemonic in sociology and psychology in the second half of the twentieth century but also provided "an anti-capitalist conception geared to the overcoming of alienation in practice".

Alongside his numerous books, Musto has published his contributions on Marxism, socialist theory, progressive social movements, and left-wing political parties in numerous journals, including International Review of Social History, Contemporary Sociology, Critical Sociology, Science & Society, and Labor History. In a recent article written after Russian invasion of Ukraine, entitled "War and the Left: Considerations on a Chequered History", he wrote that "wars disseminate an ideology of violence, often combined with the nationalist sentiments that have torn the workers' movement apart. Rarely favouring practices of self-management and direct democracy, they increase instead the power of authoritarian institutions. If the Left wishes to return hegemonic, and to show itself capable of using its history for the tasks of today, it needs to write indelibly on its banners the words' anti-militarism' and 'No to war!'".

== Publications ==
=== Authored books ===
- The Last Years of Karl Marx: An Intellectual Biography, Stanford University Press, 2020. (Translated into Italian, Tamil, Portuguese [Brazil], Korean, German, Japanese, Arabic, Persian, Spanish, Portuguese [Portugal], Catalan, Hindi, Turkish, Chinese, Indonesian, French, Greek, Telugu)
- Another Marx: Early Manuscripts to the International, Bloomsbury Academic, 2018. (Translated into Japanese, Bengali, Chinese, Indonesian)
- Karl Marx. Biografia intellettuale e politica, 1857-1883 [Karl Marx: Intellectual and Political Biography, 1857-1883], Einaudi, 2018. ( Translated into Hungarian, Catalan, Portuguese, Spanish)
- Ripensare Marx e i marxismi. Studi e saggi [Rethinking Marx and Marxisms: Studies and Essays], Carocci, 2011. (Translated into Korean, Portuguese)

=== Edited books ===
- Marx and 'Le Capital': Evaluation, History, Reception, Routledge, 2022.
- Rethinking Alternatives with Marx: Economy, Ecology and Migration, Palgrave Macmillan, 2021. (Translated into Italian).
- Karl Marx's Writings on Alienation, Palgrave Macmillan, 2021. (Translated into Italian, Kurdish)
- The Marx Revival: Key Concepts and New Interpretations, Cambridge University Press, 2020. (Translated into Italian, Korean, Catalan, Portuguese)
- (With S. Gupta and B. Amini) Karl Marx's Life, Ideas, and Influences: A Critical Examination on the Bicentenary, Palgrave Macmillan, 2019.
- Marx's Capital after 150 Years: Critique and Alternative to Capitalism, Routledge, 2019. (Translated into Italian)
- (With G. Comninel and V. Wallis) The International After 150 Years: Labour Versus Capital, Then and Now, Routledge, 2015.
- Workers Unite! The International 150 Years Later, Bloomsbury Academic, 2014. (Translated into Italian, Portuguese, Tamil, Telugu, Hindu, Spanish, French, Japanese)
- Marx for Today, Routledge, 2012. (Translated into Spanish [Argentina], Chinese, Spanish [Spain])
- Karl Marx, Introduzione alla critica dell’economia politica [Introduction to the Critique of Political Economy], Quodlibet, 2010.
- Karl Marx's Grundrisse: Foundations of the Critique of Political Economy 150 Years Later, Routledge, 2008. (Translated into Persian, Chinese, Italian, Spanish)
- Sulle tracce di un fantasma. L’opera di Karl Marx tra filologia e filosofia [In the Tracks of a Spectre: The Work of Karl Marx between Philology and Philosophy], Manifestolibri, 2005. (Translated into Spanish)

=== Selected journal articles ===
- "War and the Left: Considerations on a Chequered History", Critical Sociology, vol. 48, 2022, n. 4: 569-581.
- "New Profiles of Marx after the Marx-Engels-Gesamtausgabe (MEGA²)", Contemporary Sociology, vol. 49 (2020), n. 4: 407-419.
- "The Post-1989 Radical Left in Europe: Results and Prospects", Socialism and Democracy, vol. 31 (2017), n. 2: 1-32.
- "The Myth of the 'Young Marx' in the Interpretations of the Economic and Philosophic Manuscripts of 1844", Critique, vol. 43 (2015), n. 2: 233-260.
- "Revisiting Marx's Concept of Alienation", Socialism and Democracy, vol. 24 (2010), n. 3: 79-101.
- "The Rediscovery of Karl Marx", International Review of Social History, vol. 52 (2007), n. 3: 477-498.
