= Dominique Janicaud =

French philosopher

- Born: 14 November 1937; Paris, France
- Died: 18 August 2002 (aged 64); Èze, France

Education
- Education: École Normale Supérieure
- Doctoral advisor: Pierre Aubenque

Philosophical work
- Era: Contemporary philosophy
- Region: Western philosophy
- School: Continental philosophy
- Institutions: University of Nice
- Doctoral students: Marc Froment-Meurice; Emmanuel Gabellieri; Jean-Marc Ghitti; Arnaud Villani
- Main interests: Metaphysics, existentialism, hermeneutics, history of French spiritualism

Dominique Janicaud (French: [ʒaniko]; 14 November 1937 – 18 August 2002) was a French philosopher, known for his critical approach to the philosophy of Heidegger. He was the director of its Center for the History of Ideas at the University of Nice Sophia Antipolis until 1998, when he was succeeded by André Tosel.

== Bibliography ==
- Une Généalogie du spiritualisme français. Aux sources du bergsonisme : Ravaisson et la métaphysique, La Haye, M. Nijhoff, 1969. Archives internationales d'histoire des idées. 30. Bibliogr. pp. 220–235. Index. Réédition : Ravaisson et la métaphysique : une généalogie du spiritualisme français, Paris, J. Vrin, 1997. ISBN 2-7116-1345-3
- Hegel et le destin de la Grèce, Paris, J. Vrin, 1975. Bibliogr. p. 343-366. Index. Thèse de lettres, université de Paris IV, 1973.
- Avec Jean-François Mattéi, La Métaphysique à la limite : cinq études sur Heidegger, Paris, Presses universitaires de France, 1983. Collection Épiméthée. ISBN 2-13-037603-7
- La Puissance du rationnel, Paris, Gallimard, 1985. ISBN 2-07-070343-6
- L'Ombre de cette pensée : Heidegger et la question politique, Grenoble, J. Millon, 1990. ISBN 2-905614-35-8
- À nouveau la philosophie, Paris, A. Michel, 1991. ISBN 2-226-05583-5
- Le Tournant théologique de la phénoménologie française, Combas, Éd. de l'Éclat, 1991. ISBN 2-905372-59-1
- Chronos : pour l'intelligence du partage temporel, Paris, B. Grasset, 1997. ISBN 2-246-53441-0
- La Phénoménologie éclatée, Paris, Éd. de l'Eclat, 1998. ISBN 2-84162-027-1
- Heidegger en France, Paris, A. Michel, 2001. Collection : Bibliothèque Albin Michel. Idées, ISSN 1158-4572. Vol. 1, Récit; Vol. 2, Entretiens. Note(s) : Bibliogr. vol. 1, p. 543-572. Index. ISBN 2-226-12681-3 (vol. 1). - ISBN 2-226-12703-8 (vol. 2).
- L'Homme va-t-il dépasser l'humain ?, Paris, Bayard, 2002. ISBN 2-227-02015-6
- Aristote aux Champs-Élysées : promenades et libres essais philosophiques, La Versanne, Encre Marine, 2003. ISBN 2-909422-72-0
- Les Bonheurs de Sophie : une initiation à la philosophie en 30 mini-leçons, La Versanne, Encre Marine, 2003. ISBN 2-909422-73-9
