= Pierre Aubenque =

French philosopher (1929–2020)

- Born: 23 July 1929; L'Isle-Jourdain, France
- Died: 23 February 2020 (aged 90); Versailles, France
- Occupation: Philosopher

Pierre Aubenque (23 July 1929 – 23 February 2020) was a French philosopher. He was strongly focused on Aristotle.

== Biography ==
Aubenque was a student at the École normale supérieure in Paris and earned his agrégation in philosophy in 1950. He became an assistant professor at the University of Montpellier, then a professor at the University of Franche-Comté and Aix-Marseille University. In 1969, he began teaching philosophy at the University of Paris (later Paris IV). He also wrote many works published by Éditions Beauchesne. He was the doctoral advisor of Dominique Janicaud.

== Works ==
- Le problème de l'être chez Aristote (1962)
- La prudence chez Aristote (1963)
- Sénèque (1964)
- La prudence chez Kant (1975)
- Histoire de la philosophie (1979)
- Concepts et catégories dans la pensée antique (1980)
- Aristote et les choses humaines (1998)
- Dictionnaire des philosophes (1998)
- Faut-il déconstruire la métaphysique ? (2009)
- Problèmes aristotéliciens. Philosophie théorique (2009)
- Problèmes aristotéliciens. Philosophie pratique (2011)
