= Marc Froment-Meurice =

French philosopher

Marc Froment-Meurice (30 October 1953, Tokyo – 25 June 2019, Penguily) is a French and American writer and philosopher.

== Early life ==
Born in Tokyo on 30 October 1953 to a French diplomat father and a mother Pupille de la Nation who met while both graduating from the École Nationale d’Administration (ENA).

Much of Froment-Meurice's youth and education occurred abroad, such as the USSR and Egypt.

In 1965, he moved with his family from Cairo back to Paris, France, where he attended Lycée Pasteur. Then in 1967–68, he studied at Lycée Louis-le-Grand. In May 1968, he participated in anarchist activism. In 1970 he graduated with a Bachelor of Arts in philosophy.

From 1971 to 1974 Froment-Meurice travelled frequently in Greece, while studying Heidegger's philosophy with Professors François Fédier and Jean Beaufret. In 1975 got a Master in philosophy at University of Paris X Nanterre, with his work on Descartes and Rimbaud.

In 1975 he traveled alone from Paris to Bali, at first by train (Orient Express, from Venezia to Istanbul), and then by bus (some kind of Greyhound, from Istanbul to Erzurum, Teheran, Kandahar, and Kabul). In Sumatra he contracted malaria and nearly died in the jungle. He reached Bali for the native music but came back by plane to Zurich.

== Career ==
In 1976 he worked briefly in the cinema industry. From 1977 to 1979 he worked as a teacher for the Education Nationale. While teaching, he went back to University to defend a "Doctorat de 3ème cycle", the equivalent of a Ph.D. from University of Paris-X Nanterre in philosophy (aesthetics), under the direction of Professor Daniel Charles (Paris VIII-Vincennes). The defense took place at Nanterre in the presence of John Cage as a member of the jury on 24 October 1979. The title of this dissertation is "La Pensée de John Cage". It was published in 1982 with the French title: Les Intermittences de la Raison - Penser Cage, Entendre Heidegger (Klincksieck, series directed by Mikel Dufrenne).

From 1980 to 1989 he lived in Paris, and worked mainly at Gallimard as an editor and reader. From 1980 to 1983 he also worked at the Centre de la Cinématographie (CNC), and at the Institut national de l'audiovisuel (INA) at the National Radiodiffusion (service of archives).

In 1987, as he published his first Literature book, La Disparue, he went back to the university to work on a second Ph.D. (this time, a "doctorat d'État") at the University of Nice Sophia-Antipolis. The dissertation directed by Professor Dominique Janicaud was defended in Nice on 11 November 1992. The title is "Poétique de Heidegger" and has been partially published as his first book in English as That Is To Say - Heidegger's Poetics by University of Stanford Press in 1998.

In 1989 he moved to Seattle where he taught for 2 years as a lecturer at the University of Washington, in the Department of Romance Languages.

In 1992 he taught at the Université de Montréal in the Comparative Literature Program and then at the Collège International de Philosophie in Paris.

In 1993, as his mother died on January 1, he moved to Irvine, CA, where he taught at UC Irvine as a lecturer in the French and Italian Department. Followed Jacques Derrida seminar whom he had met in the College International de Philosophie in 1989 (see Derrida, "Heidegger and the Question").

With a post-doctorate fellowship granted by the Centre National du Livre, on "Difference in Heidegger and Derrida", he lived in Billancourt, following Derrida's seminars at the HESS.

In 1995 he moved to Baton Rouge, Louisiana, where he taught philosophy in the department of Philosophy and Religion at LSU.

In 1996 he moved to Nashville, Tennessee. From 1996 to 2016, he was a tenured full Professor at Vanderbilt University in the Department of French and Italian, where he was Director of the Bandy Center for Baudelaire Studies and chair of the department.

In 2006 he became a US citizen.

He retired at the end of 2016 and now lives in Brittany (Bretagne, France).

== Bibliography ==
=== Books ===
- Les Intermittences de la raison. Penser Cage, entendre Heidegger, Klincksieck, 1982.
- Sartre et l'existentialisme, Nathan, 1984
- Heidegger: "Qu'est-ce que la Métaphysique?", Nathan 1985, second edition 2002.
- La Disparue, récit, Gallimard, 1987.
- Déposition (Bauduin), 3A ed., 1988.
- Solitudes (de Rimbaud à Heidegger), Galilée, la philosophie en effet, 1989.
- La Chose même (Solitudes II,) Galilée, la philosophie en effet, 1992.
- Tombeau de Trakl, Belin, l'extrême contemporain, 1992.
- Solitudes, from Rimbaud to Heidegger, SUNY Press, 1995.
- C'est-à-dire. Poétique de Heidegger, Galilée, 1996.
- Lignes de Fuite (with Roberto Altmann), Pierre Courtaud ed., 1998
- That Is To Say (Heidegger's Poetics), Stanford University Press, 1998.
- La Chimère. Tombeau de Nerval, Belin, l'extrême contemporain, 2001.
- Incitations, Galilée, la philosophie en effet, 2002.

=== Journal articles (2002 - 2009) ===
• “Obamabo,” Médiane. Magazine philosophique du Québec, vol.3 (2), Spring 2009 (www.revuemediane.ca)

• “MFM,” 2 photographs, in Babel. Für Werner Hamacher, edited Urs Engeler (Basel/Weil am Rhein, 2009).

• “Dating — Deconstruction,” in The Origins of Deconstruction, ed. M. McQuillan & I. Willis (Macmillan, 2009).

• “A Blood Altered in its Own Sense,” in Community, Communication, Communism: The Thought of Georges Bataille, edited by Andrew J. Mitchell and Jason Winfree (SUNY Press, 2009).

• “A coups tôt tirés”, Po&sie, 125, 2008.

• “Post(e) J .C.” in Rencontrer Encountering John Cage, dir. J.-L. Houchard & Daniel Charles. Eine: Voix Edition, 2008.

• “From (Within): the Ends of Politics” in The Politics of Deconstruction. Jacques Derrida and the Other of Philosophy, ed. Martin McQuillan. London: Pluto Press, 2008.

• “Shut Your Eyes and See…,” Theory@Buffalo 11, “Aesthetics & Finitude,” pp. 179–196, 2007.

• “Morceaux du Livre des Morts,” Po&sie 119, 2007.

• “Arrivée à Destin,” Po&sie 116, 2006.

• “AphaSia,” www.drunkenboat, 2004.

• “Ecrire sans écrire,” Po&sie 107, 2004.

• “In the Name of the Other, I… Gérard de Nerval,” Journal of European Studies 33 (3/4), 2003. Traduction MFM d’un chapitre de La Chimère (2001).

• “Phénoménologie de la Mélancolie,” Bulletin Baudelairien, 37, 2002.

• “A Sense of Loss: Whatever It May Be,” Paragraph, 25 (2), 2002.

• “Strictly Between Us. Jean-Luc Nancy,” The New Centennial Review, vol. 2, #3, Michigan University Press, 2002. Voir Incitations (2002).

• “Sois Sage, O ma Douleur,” Bulletin Baudelairien, 36, 2001.

• “No Future,” in Granel. L’éclat, le combat, l’ouvert, éd. Jean-Luc Nancy (Paris: Belin, 2001).

• “Specters of M,” in Parallax, 20, 2001.

• “L'Animal dépravé,” Bulletin Baudelairien, 35, 2000.

• “Aphasia or the Last Word,” in Philosophy and Tragedy, ed. Miguel de Beistegui and Simon Sparks. London: Routledge, 2000.

• “In No Way,” Po&sie, 90, 1999.

• “Personne a/à ce nom,” in L'animal autobiographique. Autour du travail de Jacques Derrida, ed. Marie-Louise Mallet. Paris: Galilée, 1999. Repris dans Incitations (2002).

• “L'air de rien,” Po&sie, 87, 1999.

• “Au pied de la lettre ou comment désarmer la critique, en lisant Un balcon en forêt," Pleine Marge, 25, 1997 .

• “A la Gloire de Gérard de Nerval,” Po&sie, 79,1997. Repris dans La Chimère (2001).

• “Pleronoma. Postface au nom du nom,” Postface à Pleroma. Dialecture de Hegel, de Werner Hamacher. Paris: Galilée, 1996.

• “Le libre usage de la parole,” in Autour de Nathalie Sarraute. Actes du Colloque de Cerisy-la-Salle, éd. Sabine Raffy. Besançon: Presses Universitaires de Besançon, 1995.

• “Step (Not) Beyond,” L'esprit créateur, XXXV, #3, 1995. Traduction par Jan Plug d’un chapitre de la « Poétique de Heidegger » (1992); texte différent de celui paru dans That Is To Say (Stanford, 1998).

• “Avant-dire” à ma traduction de R. Gasché, Le Tain du miroir. Derrida et la philosophie de la réflexion. Paris: Galilée, 1995.

• “Faut-il brûler Trakl?,” in Po&sie, 55, 1991. Repris dans La Chimère (2001).

• “L'Homme de parole,” MLN, 105, 1990.

• “La chose même,” Aléa, 9, 1989. Repris dans La Chose même (1992).

• “A l'image de rien,” Le Temps de la réflexion, X, 1989. Repris comme chapitre I. de La Chose même (1992).

• “Die unheimliche Heimat,” in Liechtensteiner Almanach, 2. Vaduz, Liechstenstein: H.-P. Gassner Verlag, 1989. Traduction (inégale) en allemand d’un chapitre de Solitudes (1989).

• “Sans mot dire,” in Autour de Etre et Temps de Heidegger: Questions de méthode et voies de recherche, ed. Jean-Pierre Cometti & Dominique Janicaud. Marseille: Sud, 1989. Repris (sans le dire) dans C'est-à-dire (1996).

• “Le double état de la parole,” in Cahier de l'Herne Hölderlin, ed. Jean-François Courtine. Paris: L'Herne, 1989. Repris dans Solitudes I.

• “Au demeurant,” in Demeure-Bauduin. Saint-Brieuc: Office Départemental de Développement Culturel des Côtes-du-Nord, 1989.

• “Musicage,” Revue d'esthétique, 13/14/15, 1988. Repris dans Solitudes II.

• “Du pareil au Même,” Le Temps de la réflexion, IX, 1988. Repris dans Solitudes II.

• “Tourner la page?,” La Nouvelle Revue de Psychanalyse, 37, 1988. Repris dans Solitudes I.

• “L'Horreur du vide,” Le Temps de la réflexion, VIII, 1987. Repris dans Solitudes I.

• “Martin Heidegger,” La Nouvelle Revue Française, 410, 1987.

• “Du Monologue,” La Nouvelle Revue de Psychanalyse, 36, 1987. Repris dans Solitudes I.

• “Long est le Temps,” La Nouvelle Revue de Psychanalyse, 32, 1985. Article dédié à la mémoire de Catherine Zahou. Repris dans Solitudes I.

• “Moderne, Absolument,” “Le Maximum du minimum,” “Le Grand Emballage,” Le Temps de la réflexion, VI, 1985.

• “Qu'est-ce que Dieu?” in La Nouvelle Revue de Psychanalyse, 30, 1984. Reprinted in Analyse ordinaire, Analyse extraordinaire, ed. Michel Gribinski. Paris: Gallimard, 1994.

• “Le Don d'Hermès. Heidegger entre les deux feux de la traduction,” Le Temps de la réflexion, V, 1984. Repris dans C'est-à-dire (1996).

• “L'Art moderne et la technique,” Cahier de l'Herne Martin Heidegger. Paris: L'Herne, 1983.

• “La Recherche de l'oubli,” Le Temps de la réflexion, III, 1982. (Sur 2 livres de Peter Handke.)

• “La Voix en Cage,” Digraphe, 28, 1982

== Translations and presentations ==
- Rodolphe Gasché, Le Tain du miroir. Derrida et la philosophie de la réflexion, Galilée, 1995.
- Werner Hamacher, Pleroma. Dialecture de Hegel, Galilée, 1996.
