= Marx-Engels-Gesamtausgabe =

Complete edition of the works of Karl Marx and Friedrich Engels

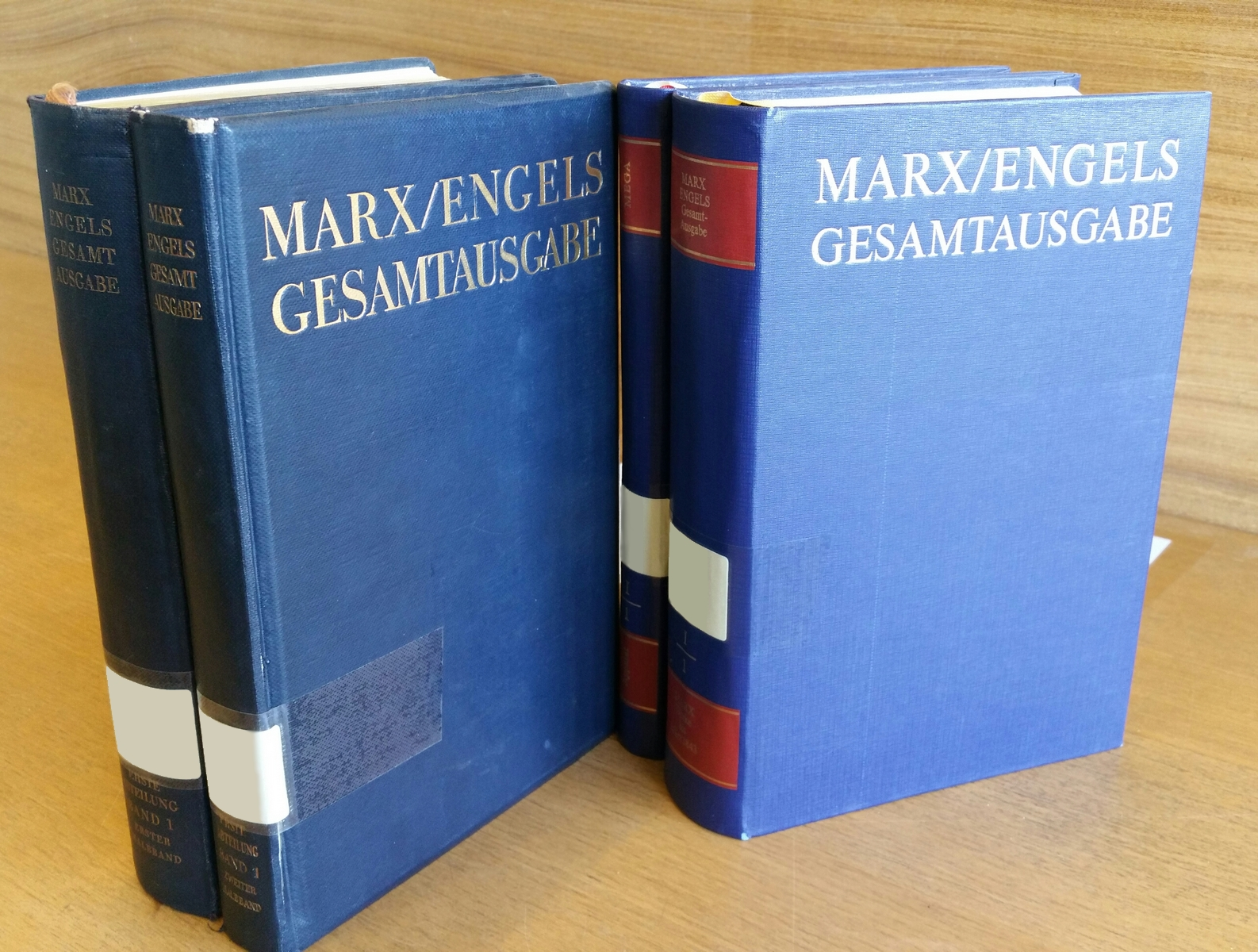
- Volumes I of MEGA¹ (left) and MEGA²
- Editor: International Marx-Engels Foundation (IMES)
- Author: Karl Marx and Friedrich Engels
- Language: Original languages, primarily German
- Genre: Collected works, critical edition
- Published: 1927–1941 (MEGA¹; 12 volumes); 1975–present (MEGA²; 62 volumes, 114 planned)
- Publisher: Dietz Verlag, Akademie Verlag, De Gruyter
- Publication place: Germany, Russia, Netherlands, international
- Website: mega.bbaw.de/de

The Marx-Engels-Gesamtausgabe (MEGA; German for "Marx-Engels Complete Edition") is the largest collection of the writings of Karl Marx and Friedrich Engels. It is a historical-critical edition that aims to publish all of their written works in their original languages, including manuscripts, letters, and notebooks. The project is intended to produce a complete, scholarly, and politically independent edition that documents the intellectual development of Marx and Engels.

The history of the MEGA is divided into two main periods. The first edition, known as MEGA¹, began in the Soviet Union in the 1920s under the direction of David Riazanov at the Marx–Engels Institute in Moscow. It was an ambitious international and academic project, but it fell victim to Stalinism; Riazanov was removed in 1931, and the project was ultimately discontinued in 1941 after publishing only 12 volumes.

Work resumed in the 1960s on a second edition, MEGA², as a joint venture between the Institutes for Marxism-Leninism in East Berlin and Moscow. The first volume was published in 1975. However, the editing during this period was influenced by the official ideology of the ruling communist parties. Following the fall of the Berlin Wall in 1989, the project was fundamentally restructured. In 1990, the International Marx-Engels Foundation (IMES) was established to oversee the edition, which is now carried out by an international network of scholars, with coordination led by the Berlin-Brandenburg Academy of Sciences and Humanities. The post-1990 project is guided by the principles of depoliticization, internationalization, and the highest scholarly standards.

The MEGA is organized into four sections: I. Works, Articles, and Drafts; II. Das Kapital and its preliminary studies; III. Correspondence; and IV. Excerpts, Notebooks, and Marginalia. The edition has revealed new insights into Marx and Engels's thought, showing their theories as more of an open-ended work in progress and highlighting significant differences between Marx's original manuscripts and the versions published by later editors.

== History ==
=== Prehistory: The Viennese Plan ===
The first plan for a complete historical-critical edition of Karl Marx's works emerged in late 1910. With the copyright on Marx's works set to expire in 1913, a circle of Austro-Marxists in Vienna—including Max Adler, Otto Bauer, Rudolf Hilferding, and Karl Renner—along with Russian Marxist scholar David Riazanov, proposed an internationally authorized edition. Their plan, dated 1 January 1911, called for an "absolutely complete and systematically ordered collected works of Marx" that would allow for the comparison of manuscripts and different published versions.

The proposal was sent to the executive committee of the Social Democratic Party of Germany (SPD), which controlled most of Marx's literary estate. However, the plan failed to gain support. Prominent party officials were skeptical of the project's practical benefit, favoring popular publications for political education over a large-scale academic undertaking that served what they considered "decorative purposes" only. The established publishers and senior Marxist theoreticians like Karl Kautsky and Franz Mehring were also hesitant, and the plan was abandoned.

=== First edition (MEGA¹) ===
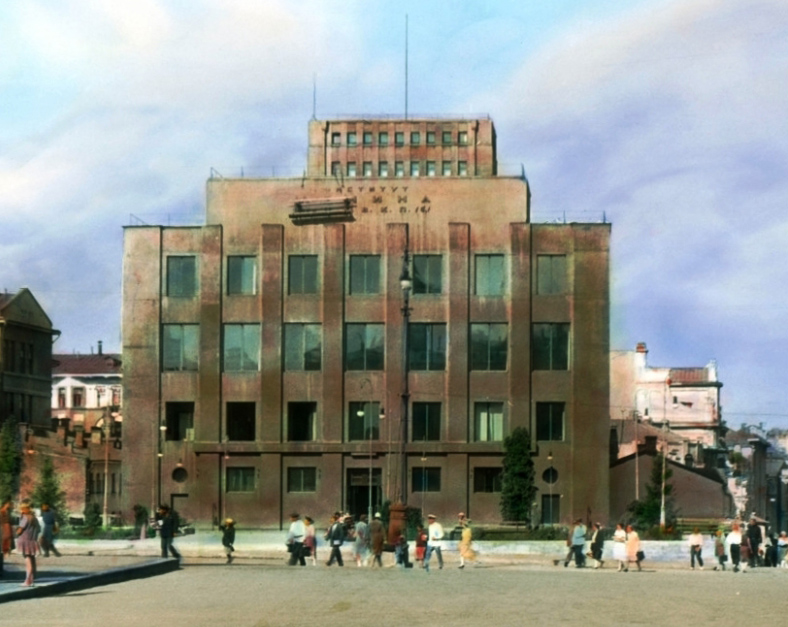
The Marx-Engels Institute in Moscow in 1931, headquarters of the first MEGA project

The idea for a complete edition was revived after the Russian Revolution. In 1918, a committee including Vladimir Lenin was tasked with publishing the complete works of Marx and Friedrich Engels. Riazanov, who had joined the Bolshevik Party and was valued by Lenin for his expertise, was named director of the newly founded Marx-Engels Museum in 1920, which was reorganized into the Marx–Engels Institute (MEI) in Moscow the following year. Riazanov's institute took over the task of preparing what would become the first MEGA (MEGA¹).

A major obstacle was that most of Marx's and Engels's original manuscripts were held by the SPD in its Berlin archives. To overcome the political schism between communists and social democrats, Riazanov secured an academic partnership. In 1924, he signed a collaboration agreement with the Institute for Social Research in Frankfurt, whose director, Carl Grünberg, was an old Austro-Marxist acquaintance. The Frankfurt institute, funded by the young radical leftist Felix Weil, served as a western partner, negotiating with the SPD to access and photograph the manuscripts for the MEI. The name "Social Research" was, in the words of one scholar, an "Aesopian term" for the institute's primary mission of advancing Marxist studies. A joint publishing house, the Marx-Engels-Archiv Verlagsgesellschaft, was established, and the first volume of MEGA¹ appeared in 1927.

The project was an international effort, involving scholars from different "generations" and nationalities. However, its academic autonomy was soon threatened by political developments. The SPD terminated its cooperation in 1929 in response to increasingly harsh criticism from Moscow-guided communists. More decisively, the project fell victim to Joseph Stalin's purges. Riazanov was arrested and removed from the MEI in 1931, and many German and Russian staff members were dismissed or arrested. After the Nazis came to power in Germany in 1933, the Frankfurt Institute was closed and its Jewish and Marxist staff forced into exile. With its key figures and institutional supports gone, the MEGA¹ project was terminated in 1941, with only 12 of the planned 42 volumes having been published.

=== Second edition (MEGA²) ===
==== Soviet-GDR project ====
The idea of a complete edition was revived in the 1960s as a joint project of the Institutes for Marxism-Leninism of the ruling communist parties in East Berlin (Socialist Unity Party of Germany; SED) and Moscow (Communist Party of the Soviet Union; CPSU). A collaboration agreement was signed in 1964, and the editorial principles were finalized in 1969. The International Institute of Social History (IISH) in Amsterdam, which had acquired most of Marx's original manuscripts from the SPD in 1938, allowed access to its archives. The first volume of the second edition (MEGA²) was published in 1975 by Dietz Verlag in East Berlin.

While the academic standards of text reproduction were high from the beginning, the edition was constrained by its political context. The project was intended to serve the "urgent need of science and revolutionary praxis", and its prefaces and commentaries were heavily influenced by the official ideology of Marxism–Leninism. This political patronage led later scholars to characterize the project during this period as an "unhappy institutionalization" under a canonized orthodoxy. Between 1975 and 1989, 40 volumes were published.

==== Post-1990 international project ====
The collapse of the communist regimes in Eastern Europe brought the project to a halt and created a new opportunity for its reorganization. On the initiative of the IISH, the International Marx-Engels Foundation (IMES) was founded in 1990 to continue the MEGA "on a purely scientific and politically independent basis". The project was "liberated" from the "bondage of political parties" and transformed into a truly international, scholarly collaboration.

The new project operates under what one scholar described as three new commitments: "(1) depoliticization; (2) internationalization; and (3) achievement of high scholarly standards". The IMES, based in Amsterdam, oversees the edition, with the Berlin-Brandenburg Academy of Sciences and Humanities (BBAW) responsible for its coordination. Other participating institutions include the Karl Marx House of the Friedrich Ebert Foundation in Trier and the Russian State Archive for Socio-Political History (RGASP) in Moscow. Research teams in Germany, Russia, Japan, France, the Netherlands, the United States, and other countries work on editing the individual volumes. The first volume edited under the new structure was published by Akademie Verlag in 1998. As of 2024, the publication is ongoing, with the publisher being De Gruyter.

== Structure and principles ==
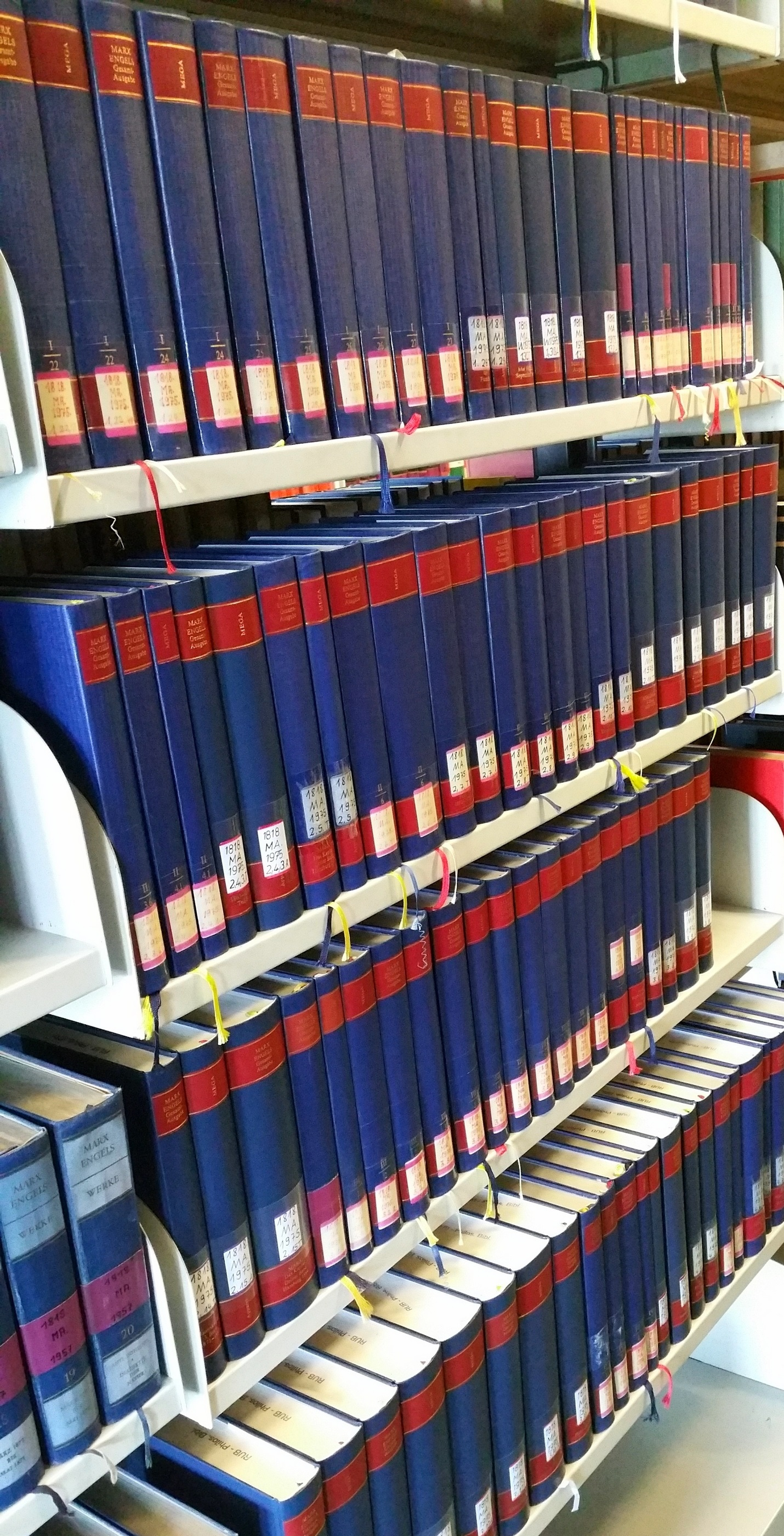
MEGA² volumes on a shelf

The MEGA is a historical-critical (historisch-kritische) edition. Its goal is to reproduce all the writings of Marx and Engels in their entirety and in their original languages, meticulously documenting all corrections, deletions, and variations in the manuscripts. It presents the texts without interpretation, allowing readers to trace the intellectual development and creative process of the authors.

The edition is divided into four sections (Abteilungen):

- Section I: Works, Articles, Drafts. This section contains all philosophical, economic, historical, and political works, articles, and manuscripts by Marx and Engels, with the exception of Das Kapital.
- Section II: Das Kapital and Preliminary Studies. This section is dedicated to Marx's magnum opus, Das Kapital, including all three volumes, its preliminary versions (such as the Grundrisse), and all related manuscripts. The complete ancillary texts for Das Kapital comprise 15 volumes in this section, each accompanied by a bulky auxiliary volume.
- Section III: Correspondence. This section contains the complete correspondence of Marx and Engels, both with each other and with third parties from around the world. It includes around 4,000 letters from Marx and Engels and 10,000 letters written to them, a large number of which are published for the first time.
- Section IV: Excerpts, Notebooks, and Marginalia. This section includes Marx's and Engels's notebooks of excerpts, which contain summaries and notes from the books they read. The some 200 notebooks bear witness to Marx's "truly encyclopedic labors", with excerpts from 1838 to 1882 written in eight languages on a wide range of subjects, including philosophy, art history, political economy, technology, and the natural sciences.

The original plan for MEGA² from 1969 envisioned a total of 142 volumes. As of 2026, 114 volumes are planned, of which 62 have been published. The project's completion is expected to take several more decades.

== Scholarly significance ==
The MEGA project has fundamentally changed the understanding of Marx's and Engels's work by providing access to the full range of their writings, including previously unknown or unpublished manuscripts. This has allowed for a more nuanced and "open-ended" view of their theories, showing them less as a closed, deterministic system and more as a lifelong work in progress. According to Marcello Musto, the edition provides the textual basis for rethinking a Marx who is "radically different from the author who was dogmatically converted into the fons et origo of 'actually existing socialism'".

One of the most significant findings has been the extent of Friedrich Engels's editorial interventions in the second and third volumes of Das Kapital, which he compiled from Marx's manuscripts after his death. The publication of these manuscripts in Section II of MEGA has revealed key differences between Marx's original drafts and Engels's published versions. For example, scholars have shown that Engels gave the "law of the tendency of the rate of profit to fall" a "considerably more deterministic character" than was indicated in Marx's own writings. The MEGA has also shown how Engels reduced Marx's complex analysis of economic cycles to simpler models, losing some of the original nuance regarding sectoral and unbalanced development.

Another key text reconsidered through MEGA is The German Ideology. The publication of the original manuscripts in volume I/5 (2017) established "once and for all the fragmentary character of the text". Previous editions had presented the material as a finished book, creating the impression that it contained a foundational chapter where Marx and Engels exhaustively laid out their "materialist conception of history". The MEGA edition demonstrated this to be a 20th-century editorial construction.

Section IV of the MEGA has also yielded new insights. For example, MEGA IV/14, published in 2017, contains Marx's previously unpublished notebooks on the Panic of 1857, known as the Books of Crisis. These notebooks offer a "real-time documentation" of Marx's empirical research during the first global economic crisis, containing excerpts and data from newspapers like The Economist and The Times. This material is crucial for understanding the development of Marx's crisis theory and his struggle to conceptualize circular production processes, which led him to formulate one of the first input-output tables in his Grundrisse manuscript. Section IV has also opened up new areas of research, particularly regarding Marx's ecological thought. His notebooks on agronomy, geology, mineralogy, and chemistry reveal a deep engagement with the natural sciences. Marx's excerpts from the work of agricultural chemist Justus von Liebig and scientist Karl Fraas show his concern with soil depletion, deforestation, and the ecological unsustainability of capitalist agriculture. This has led scholars to argue that ecology would have played a much greater role in his later work had he been able to complete it.

== See also ==
- Marx/Engels Collected Works (MECW)
- Marx-Engels-Werke (MEW)
