= André Tosel =

French philosopher

- Born: 15 June 1941; Nice, France
- Died: 14 March 2017 (aged 75); Nice, France
- Education: École Normale Supérieure
- Occupations: Philosopher, academic administrator
- Employer: University of Nice Sophia Antipolis
- Political party: French Communist Party (1972–1984)

André Tosel (15 June 1941 – 14 March 2017) was a French Marxist philosopher and academic administrator. He taught Philosophy at the University of Franche-Comté and Pantheon-Sorbonne University until he became a full professor of philosophy at the University of Nice Sophia Antipolis. He served as its vice president from 1992 to 1998, and as the director of its Center for the History of Ideas from 1998 to 2003. He was the author of several books about Marxism and Marxist theorists.

== Early life ==
André Tosel was born on 15 June 1941 in Nice, France. He was raised as a Roman Catholic, and he took a leadership position in the Jeunesse Étudiante Chrétienne at university. He graduated from the École Normale Supérieure, where he was mentored by Louis Althusser. He earned the agrégation in Philosophy in 1965. Tosel joined the Maoist Internationalist Movement during the May 1968 events. He was awarded a PhD in Philosophy in 1982.

== Career ==
Tosel taught Philosophy at the University of Franche-Comté in Besançon and Pantheon-Sorbonne University in Paris. He was a professor of philosophy at the University of Nice Sophia Antipolis in Nice, where he was the vice president from 1992 to 1998. He also succeeded Dominique Janicaud as the director of the Center for the History of Ideas from 1998 to 2003. He was elected as a member of the governing board of its college of arts in 2002, and he retired as professor emeritus in 2012.

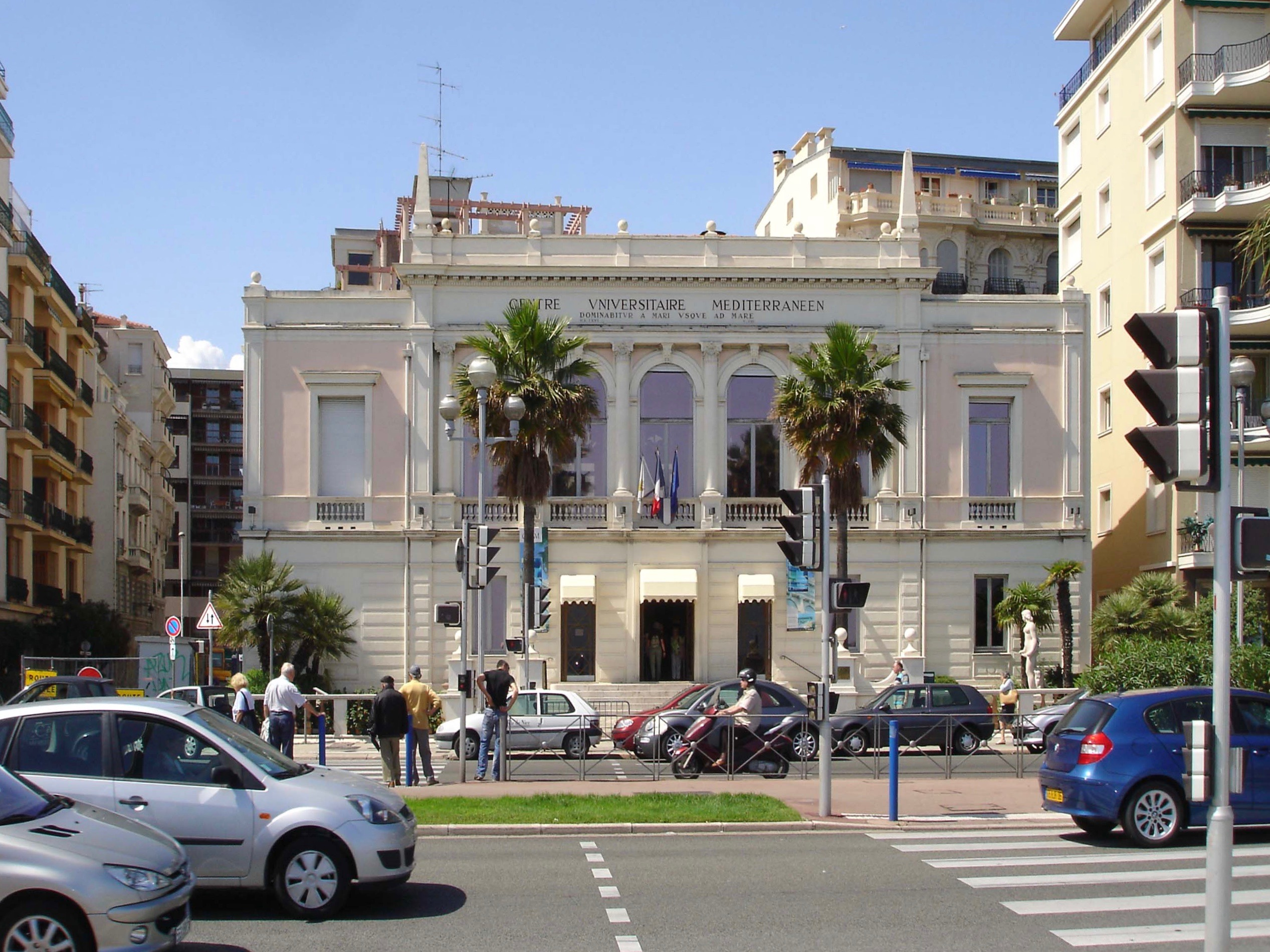
The University of Nice Sophia Antipolis, where Tosel was vice president from 1992 to 1998

Tosel was the author of many books about Marxism and Marxist theorists. He wrote about Karl Marx and Friedrich Engels, but also Baruch Spinoza, Antonio Gramsci and Hegel, Immanuel Kant, and György Lukács. He was a contributor to Actuel Marx and La Pensée. He was a member of the Société française de philosophie.

In his research, Tosel was a critic of consumerism. He argued that capitalism was inherently violent as it rested upon servitude and poverty through debt. He argued in favour of emancipation from the "passive revolution" of globalised capitalism through resistance, or the advocacy of workers rights, feminism, postcolonialism, multiculturalism, and the rejection of neo-colonialism.

According to philosopher Yvon Quiniou, Tosel played a critical role in disseminating Marxist theories in academic circles.

== Personal life, death and tributes ==
Tosel was married with children. He was a member of the French Communist Party from 1972 to 1984, and he re-joined the party in 2012, when he became associated with the Left Front.

Tosel died on 14 March 2017 in Nice.

On his death, Patrick Le Hyaric, the editor-in-chief of L'Humanité, said he was "overwhelmed with sadness" and said Tosel was "like a shining light, a touchstone in this world of ideological counter-punch where everything is hidden by powerful forces who want to take over the entirety of thought and culture."

Pierre Laurent, the chairman of the French Communist Party, said he was "very moved" by his death, and he added that Tosel had "a deep understanding of the difficulties faced by progressive forces and a willingness to exchange ideas and share his analyses and convictions, not only with a learned audience, but most importantly with young people and workers."

== Works ==
- Balibar, Étienne; Luporini, Cesare; Tosel, André (1979). Marx et sa critique de la politique. Paris: Éditions Maspero. ISBN 9782707110909. OCLC 373538523.
- Tosel, André (1984). Spinoza ou le crépuscule de la Servitude : Essai sur le Traité Théologico-Politique. Paris: Aubier. ISBN 9782700703665. OCLC 708293894.
- Tosel, André (1984). Praxis : Vers une refondation en philosophie marxiste. Paris: Éditions Sociales. ISBN 9782209056187. OCLC 636784656.
- Tosel, André (1988). Kant révolutionnaire : Droit et politique. Paris: Presses universitaires de France. ISBN 9782130432296. OCLC 223157649.
- Tosel, André (1991). L'esprit de scission. Études sur Marx, Gramsci et Lukàcs. Besançon: Presses Universitaires de Franche-Comté. ISBN 9782251604381. OCLC 911863530.
- Tosel, André (1991). Marx en italiques : aux origines de la philosophie italienne contemporaine. Mauvezin: Trans-Europ-Repress. OCLC 657973794.
- Tosel, Andrv, ed. (1993). Modernité de Gramsci?. Besançon: Presses Universitaires de Franche-Comté. ISBN 9782251604817. OCLC 925092495.
- Tosel, André (1994). Du matérialisme de Spinoza. Paris: Éditions Kimé. ISBN 9782908212778. OCLC 29947887.
- Tosel, André (1995). Démocratie et libéralismes. Paris: Editions Kimé. ISBN 9782841740147. OCLC 36476841.
- Tosel, André (1996). Études sur Marx (et Engels) : Vers un communisme de la finitude. Paris: Éditions Kimé. ISBN 9782841740529. OCLC 463911536.
- Menasseyre, Christiane; Tosel, André, eds. (1997). Figures italiennes de la rationalité. Paris: Éditions Kimé. ISBN 9782841740888. OCLC 955024911.
- Tosel, André (2009). Un monde en abîme : Essai sur la mondialisation capitaliste. Paris: Éditions Kimé. ISBN 9782841744695. OCLC 743077930.
- Tosel, André (2009). Spinoza ou l'autre (in)finitude. Paris: L'Harmattan. ISBN 9782296077249. OCLC 495054144.
- Tosel, André (2009). Le marxisme du 20e siècle. Paris: Syllepse. ISBN 9782849502365. OCLC 879189261.
- Tosel, André (2011). Scénarios de la mondialisation culturelle. Paris: Éditions Kimé. ISBN 9782841745449. OCLC 718026239.
- Tosel, André (2014). Essais pour une culture du futur. Bellecombe-en-Bauges: Éditions du Croquant. ISBN 9782365120555. OCLC 906262786.
- Tosel, André (2015). Nous citoyens laïques et fraternels? : dans le labyrinthe du complexe économico-politico-théologique. Paris: Éditions Kimé. ISBN 9782841747009. OCLC 910510769.
- Tosel, André (2016). Étudier Gramsci : pour une critique continue de la révolution passive capitaliste. Paris: Éditions Kimé. ISBN 9782841747337. OCLC 952172425.
- Tosel, André (2016). Emancipations aujourd'hui ? : pour une reprise critique. Vulaines-sur-Seine: Editions du Croquant. ISBN 9782365120920. OCLC 966417290.
