= Lawrence Krader =

American anthropologist

Lawrence Krader (December 9, 1919 – November 18, 1998) was an American anthropologist and ethnologist.

== Early life ==
Krader was born on December 9, 1919, in Jamaica, New York. In 1936, at the Philosophy Department of the City College of New York (CCNY), he studied Aristotle with Abraham Edel, Leibniz with Philipp P. Wiener, and mathematical logic and linguistics with Alfred Tarski. In 1937–1938, he also studied logic with Rudolf Carnap and ethnology with Franz Boas. In 1941, Krader graduated with a Bachelor of Arts degree at CCNY and was granted the Ketcham Award for Philosophy. As the United States entered World War II, Krader joined the merchant navy and traveled to the Russian Arctic port of Arkhangelsk before travelling to Leningrad (now Saint Petersburg) where he learned the Russian language.

== Post-war career ==
After the war, Krader returned to the US and studied linguistics (1945–1947) at Columbia University with Roman Jakobson and André Martinet. During this time, he developed an interpretation of human evolution which resulted in him leaving his focus on philosophy and commencing an intensive study of the Eurasian nomads; becoming a fellow of the Far Eastern Institute at the University of Washington in Seattle. His new research interests probably also owed something to his meeting with Karl Wittfogel in 1947, whom he helped with research and Russian translations and also to his contact with Karl Korsch. Krader was Wittfogel's assistant from 1948 to 1951. In 1952, Krader taught linguistics as a Fellow of the Russian Research Center at Harvard and married his wife Dr. Barbara Lattimer in 1953. In 1954 he graduated at Harvard with a PhD on "Kinship Systems of the Altaic-speaking peoples of the Asian Steppes" (supervised by Clyde Kluckhohn).

From 1953 to 1956, he was appointed research associate at the Bureau of Social Science Research at the American University of Washington, D.C., in the area of Central Asian Studies. In 1956–1958 he became professor in anthropology and director of the Nomads Program at the Syracuse University and leader of the China Population Program at the United States Census Bureau. From 1957 to 1959, Krader became president of the Anthropological Society of Washington. From 1958 to 1963, he taught as ordinary professor at the American University in Washington, D.C., as well as being representative for ethnology and anthropology at the Social Science Council and Human Science Council of UNESCO, leader of the anthropological section of the sociology and anthropology department at CCNY, and chairman of the sociology and anthropology department at the University of Waterloo in Canada. In 1962, Krader traveled for the first time to outer Mongolia. From 1963 to 1968 Krader received finance for his research project on the Evolution of the State and Nomadism, from the National Science Foundation.

From 1964 to 1978, Krader became secretary-general of the IUAES. For his study of the roots of the theory of evolution in the 19th century, he received support from the International Institute of Social History (Amsterdam) during 1963–1975. From 1970 to 1972, Krader was professor at the University of Waterloo but in 1972 joined the Institute for Ethnology at the Free University of Berlin, where he became director until 1982. From 1989 until his death, Krader produced 156 manuscripts including works on Labour and Value: a Theory of the Russian Revolution, Mathematical Logic, a Critique of Evolution, Linguistics and other topics. It is intended that some of this material will be published via a research project at McMaster University with the aid of an endowment.

== Quotation ==
"I'm neither a Hegelian nor a Marxist, I'm a student of both, as Marx was a student of Hegel. But Marx was also a disciple of Hegel, which I am not, nor a disciple of Marx. I am a socialist, and have been one for nearly 60 years, but not a Marxian socialist."

— Lawrence Krader, quoted in Schorkowitz (1995, p. 6)

== Works ==
- Peoples of Central Asia. Bloomington: Univ. u.a., 1963 (Uralic and Altaic Series, vol. 20)
- Social organization of the Mongol-Turkic pastoral nomads. The Hague : Mouton, 1963
- (ed.) Anthropology and Early Law. Selected from the writings of Paul Vinogradoff, Frederic William Maitland, Frederick Pollock, Maxime Kowalewsky, Rudolf Huebner, Frederic Seebohm. Basic Books 1966
- Formation of the state (Foundations of modern anthropology series) Prentice-Hall 1968
- The ethnological notebooks of Karl Marx. (studies of Morgan, Phear, Maine, Lubbock). Assen : Van Gorcum [u.a.], 1972
  - Karl Marx, die ethnologischen Exzerpthefte. hrsg. von . [Übers. von Angelika Schweikhart], Edition Suhrkamp, 800, 1. Aufl. Frankfurt am Main : Suhrkamp 1976
- Ethnologie und Anthropologie bei Marx. - München : Hanser, 1973
- The Asiatic mode of production: sources, development and critique in the writings of Karl Marx. Assen : van Gorcum, 1975
- Dialectic of civil society. Assen: van Gorcum, 1976.
- A Treatise of Social Labour. Assen: Van Gorcum, 1979 (Dialectic and Society, 5)
- (Vorwort) Karl Marx: Die technologisch-naturwissenschaftlichen Exzerpte. Historisch-kritische Ausgabe. Transkribiert u. hg. v. Hans-Peter Müller. Mit e. Vorwort v. Lawrence Krader. 1. Aufl. Frankfurt/M. etc., Ullstein, 1982
- Die Anfänge des Kapitalismus in Mitteleuropa. Frankfurt am Main [u.a.] : Lang, 1993
- Labor and value, ed. by Cyril Levitt and Rod Hay. New York, N.Y. [etc.] : Lang, 2003.
- Noetics: The Science of Thinking and Knowing, ed. by Cyril Levitt. New York: Peter Lang, 2010.
- Myth and Ideology, (published posthumously) 2021

== See also ==
- Nous

== Sources ==
- Schorkowitz, Dittmar, ed. (1995). Ethnohistorische Wege und Lehrjahre eines Philosophen: Festschrift für Lawrence Krader zum 75. Geburtstag (in German). Frankfurt a.M. / Berlin / Bern / New York / Paris / Wien: Peter Lang.
- Kramer, Fritz W. (1991). "Vita activa: Lawrence Krader". In Dandkuhler, H.J.; et al. (eds.). Dialektik: Enzyklopadische Zeitschrift fur Philosophie und Wissenschaften 1991/92. Hamburg: Felix Meiner. pp. 149ff.
