= Discours sur les passions de l'amour =

Work discovered by Victor Cousin

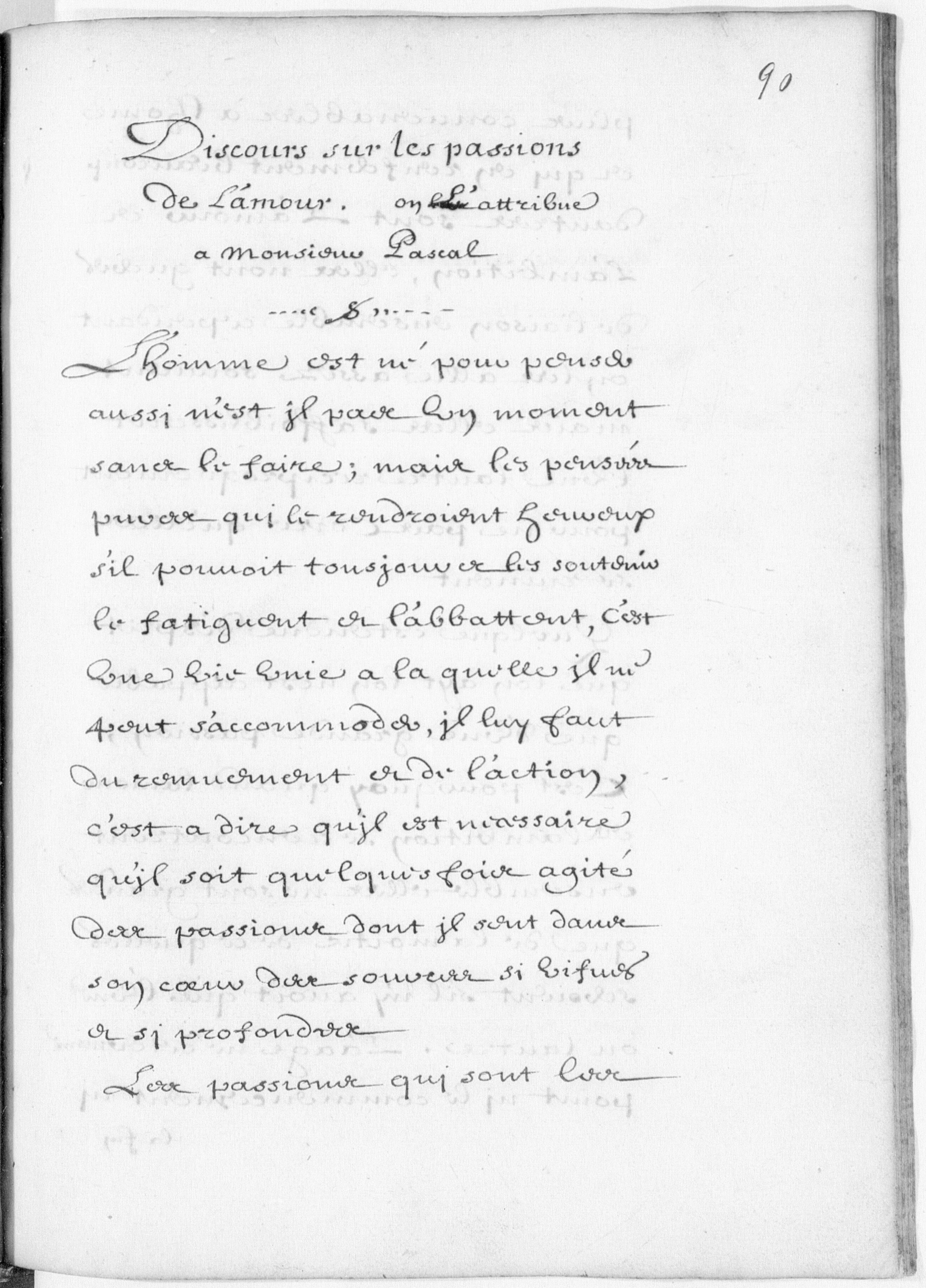
- First page of the Discours sur les passions de l'amour discovered by Victor Cousin in 1843 (reference ms. f. fr. 19303), also known as "copy C"
- Author: Blaise Pascal
- Language: French
- Publication date: After 1670
- Publication place: France

Discours sur les passions de l'amour (English: Discourse on the passions of love) was discovered by Victor Cousin in 1843 in a collection held by the Bibliothèque nationale de France. It consists of philosophical maxims mainly about love, with the themes of ambition and the passions mixed in. The phrase "On l'attribue à M. Pascal ("It is attributed to Mr. Pascal") accompanying the text immediately aroused the interest of specialists and, at first, Victor Cousin, Prosper Faugère, and Adolphe de Lescure affirmed its authenticity and recognized in it the writing and philosophy of the scholar. Faugère in particular assumed that Charlotte de Roannez, sister of Artus Gouffier and a close friend of Pascal, was the inspiration for the Discourse, a theory that did not win the support of all critics and quickly became known as "Pascal's novel".

A second copy, discovered by Augustin Gazier in 1907, reignited the debate all the more because it contained no reference to Blaise Pascal. Ferdinando Neri's 1921 work Un ritratto immaginario di Pascal is cited as the first to demonstrate that the Discours is not authentic. Publications by Louis Lafuma, in particular the article with the explicit title "Le Discours sur les passions de l'amour n'est pas de Pascal" (1949), further convinced a large part of the public that the text was not by Pascal.

The question of the Discourse's authenticity quickly divided the community of Blaise Pascal specialists, with some, such as Victor Giraud, changing their opinion as publications progressed. Both camps argued their case in the press: the Revue d'Histoire littéraire de la France, the Revue des deux Mondes, the Mercure de France and The Correspondant. The Discours itself was the subject of separate editions. Different ways of approaching the text lead to different conclusions, whether subjective literary appreciation or scientific method aimed at comparing Pascal's writings with the Discours and literary productions of the seventeenth century. Thus, Georges Brunet, Charles-Henri Boudhors, Émile Henriot and Louis Lafuma distinguish in the text the influences of Descartes, Malebranche, La Rochefoucauld and La Bruyère in addition to those of Pascal.

In the end, the hypothesis that the Discours is a forgery seems to be the most widely accepted, although no other author can really be identified. Brunet, Boudhors and Henriot, for example, even imagine that the text could be the transcription of a discussion galante, a fashionable activity in the salons of the seventeenth and eighteenth centuries. There are a number of factors that call into question the authenticity of the text, including the fact that it was written and influenced after Pascal's death, and the fact that there was no documentary evidence of the text before Victor Cousin discovered the first copy.

== Text discovery ==
=== Presentation ===
The Discourse on the Passions of Love is divided into 242 philosophical maxims focusing on the passions. While love, its birth and its evolution are the main themes, it also discusses ambition and the differences between social classes, as well as the customs to be observed in relations between men and women, and offers advice on how to make a love affair last. Most of the themes are developed using opposing arguments, so that the text takes the form of a discussion.

Love is described both as a function of the mind and as a passion beyond comprehension, but also as an art form.

Morality also has a place in the Discourse. The fact of having several partners, in particular, is discussed from various points of view. The capacity to love, i.e. the quality and power of feeling, is seen as dependent on the "greatness" of the soul. Hedonism, which could be seen as immoral, is seen here as a natural disposition. What's more, love is seen as a human tendency that contributes to our elevation, or even a necessity. The Platonic myth of the androgyne, without being named, is used to explain the search for another partner.

=== Context ===
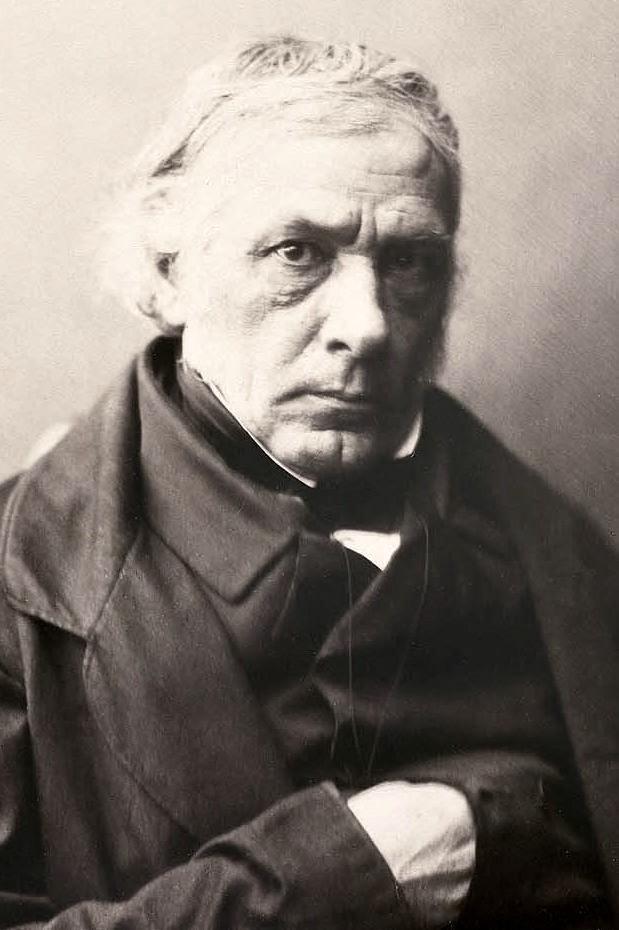
Portrait of Victor Cousin by Gustave Le Gray (1855-1860)

In 1843, Victor Cousin research led him to the Bibliothèque royale, (Note: Now known as the Bibliothèque nationale de France) where he discovered what he believed to be the collection of the abbey of Saint-Germain-des-Prés, (Note: This is in fact the Saint-Germain-Gesvres collection, originating from the library of Louis Potier, Cardinal de Gesvres, bequeathed to Saint-Germain-des-Prés in 1736 and incorporated in 1745. It remained a separate collection until 1865, even after it was incorporated into the Bibliothèque Nationale's collections. Some of the manuscripts in this collection belonged to Balthazar-Henry de Fourcy and bear his bookplate. According to Giraud (1907), it first belonged to the library of Abbé de Fourcy, then to that of Cardinal de Gesvres, then to the Abbey of Saint-Germain-des-Près, and finally to the Bibliothèque Nationale.) an in-quarto manuscript collection dated from the seventeenth century, (Note: Reference ms. f. fr. 19303.) the contents of which read "Discours sur les passions de l'amour, de M. Pascal" ("Discourse on the passions of love, by M. Pascal"). The text itself (Note: The "C copy", named after the first letter of Victor Cousin's surname.) is marked "Discours sur les passions de l'amour – on l'attribue à M. Pascal". The library's catalogue of manuscripts also mentions, at entry 74, a "Discours sur les passions de l'amour, par M. Pascal". For Cousin, there was no doubt that the twenty-page text was authentic: "From the first sentence, I felt Pascal, and my conviction grew as I went along. The evidence is abundant for anyone who has been in close contact with the Pensées". The hypothesis of the Discourse's authorship by Pascal quickly won the support of many well-known critics.

The bookplate of Balthazar-Henri de Fourcy appears in the collection to which this manuscript, known as "copy C", belongs, which leads George Brunet to wonder about its origin. (Note: Two catalogues of Fourcy's library have been examined: that of 1737, and that of 1754, the year of his death. The Discours is only mentioned in the first, with the note "attributed to M. Pascal" and a notice on the history of the constitution of the library of Fourcy père, which the son partly inherited. The manuscript, discovered by Cousin in 1843, formed part of a library that came in part from those of Pierre Michon Bourdelot, Claude de Santeul and Nicolas Amelot de La Houssaye. In 1713, the catalogue of the library of Balthazar-Henri de Fourcy's father attests to the presence of the Discours. As this library was offered for sale, eighteenth-century scholars were certainly aware of the text.) Could de Fourcy himself, or his librarian Pichet, have asked for a copy of the original manuscript of the Discourse? If so, how could they have been aware of a text that no one had mentioned before it was discovered by Cousin? Did they know the author? Brunet also notes that the copyist must have had links with de Fourcy insofar as another piece in the collection to which copy C belongs, a text by Saint-Evremond entitled Lettre sur la dévotion feinte, the attribution of which is not disputed, as well as seventeen manuscripts in another collection, (Note: The ms. fr. 19306) are also in his hand. It could be the librarian of Fourcy himself: other remarks and annotations in the same hand as the Discourse can be found in other manuscripts in Fourcy's library. The fact that Saint-Evremond's work belongs more to the realm of libertinism leads Victor Giraud to assume that the copyist was a layman: a cleric would have had no interest in copying a text so far removed from his personal convictions. (Note: In his edition of Pascal's complete works, Jean Mesnard details all the manuscripts in the hand of copyist C that have been identified. He also lists the manuscripts copied on the same paper)

As the literature on the Discours from the mid-nineteenth century onwards attests, researchers have to be content with making assumptions for want of concrete information. This vagueness about the origin of the text is all the more intriguing given that it is possible that copy C was made directly from the original manuscript, which may already have been attributed to Pascal: the copyist could therefore have had information about the true author and the reason for attributing the work to Pascal. Moreover, if the copyist wanted to conceal the identity of the author, why in that case distribute the manuscript by copying it? Especially as Pascal's manuscripts are far from being concealed, other people would have been able to recognise the Discours if it had been Pascal's and would quickly have revealed the identity of its author.

Whoever he was, the copyist to whom we owe manuscript C is very harshly judged by George Brunet: certain misunderstood words, either deliberately left out or badly copied and exchanged by others, (Note: For example, Brunet lists "constance" as "custom", "désagréable" as "d'agréable", etc.) lead him to say that he "made no effort to understand his model".

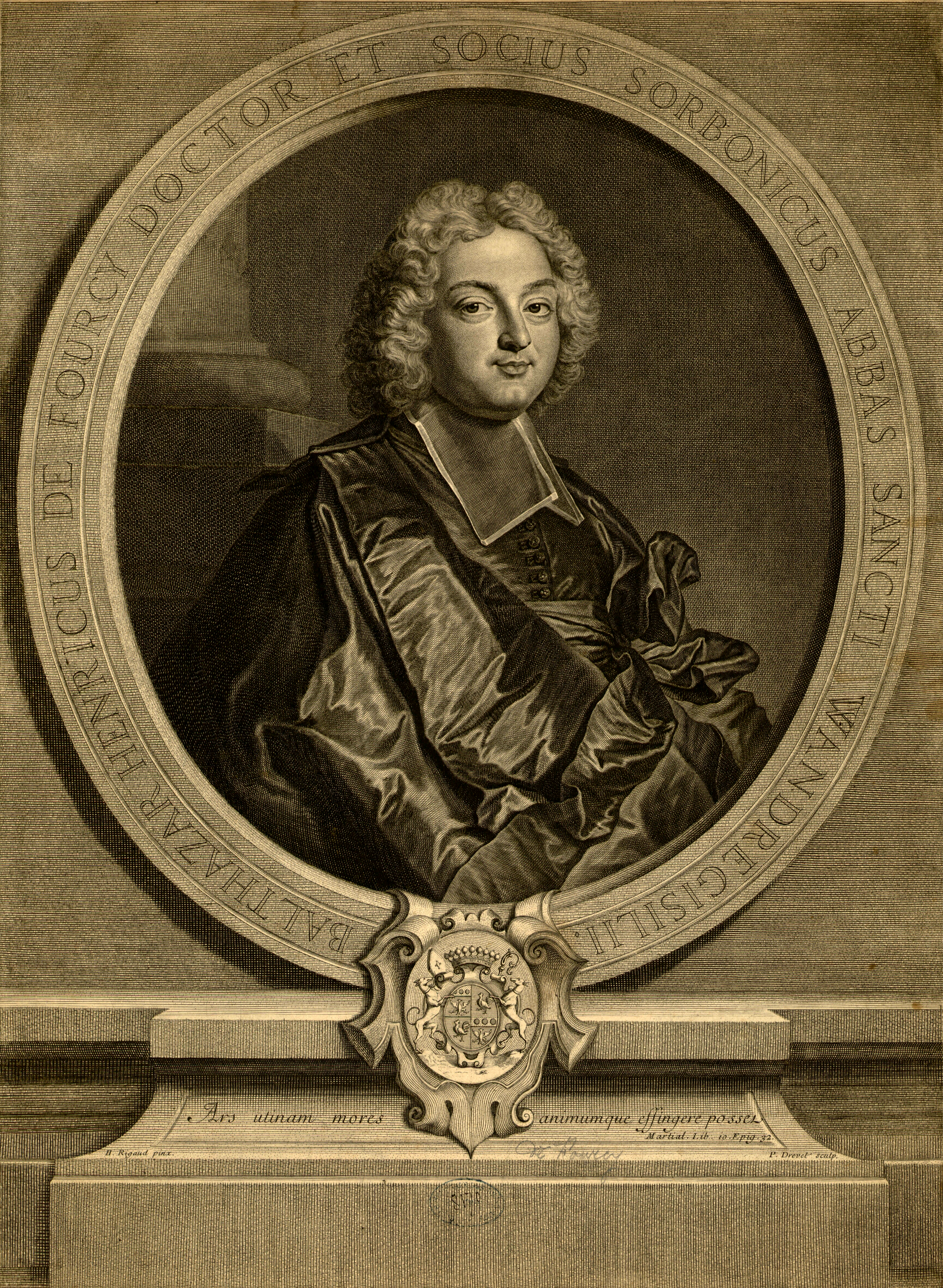
Balthazar-Henry de Fourcy, engraved by Pierre Drevet after Hyacinthe Rigaud

In 1907, Augustin Gazier came across a second version of the Discours (Note: Former call number "BnF nouv. Acq. fr. 4015", now "NAF 4015", the "copie G", named after the first letter of Augustin Gazier's surname.) and informed Victor Giraud, another critic and editor of Pascal. Apparently discovered around 1860 and catalogued in 1900, it dates from the eighteenth century. Unlike the manuscript discovered by Cousin, the latter makes no mention of Blaise Pascal, and in view of the differences between manuscripts C and G, copy G cannot have been based on the one discovered by Victor Cousin and comes either from the original manuscript or from another copy. Critics also agree that it is more recent than copy C and that this second copyist was as careless as his predecessor: he also omitted certain words, and even an entire line; however, certain differences with manuscript C could be due to liberties taken with the text. Despite these changes, Victor Giraud believes that the G copy is more faithful to the original text than the C copy. Comparisons between the two versions lead to two conclusions, highlighted by Brunet: the original writer was not very legible, and the maxims he copied are open to interpretation.

Shortly after the discovery of manuscript C, and even more so after the discovery of manuscript G, two camps clearly emerged. On the one hand were those who supported the authenticity of the Discourses, including Victor Cousin, Armand-Prosper Faugère, Ernest Havet, Alexandre Vinet, Auguste Molinier, Félix Ravaisson, Sainte-Beuve, Prévost-Paradol, Sully-Prudhomme, Émile Boutroux, Émile Faguet, Léon Brunschwicg and Gustave Michaut; on the other hand, those who claimed that the text was not by Pascal, i.e. Abbé Flottes, Augustin Gazier, Charles-Henri Boudhors, Fortunat Strowski, Georges Brunet, Maurice Souriau, Manlio Duilio Busnelli and Louis Lafuma. Finally, others were more indecisive, such as Zacharie Tourneur and Gonzague Truc. As for Victor Giraud, although he was sceptical at first, he eventually became convinced that the text was indeed by Pascal; in his review of Lafuma's work attributing the Discours to the Marquis Charles-Paul d'Escoubleau, he nevertheless acknowledged that "the conjecture proposed by M. Lafuma is not without some plausibility" and suggested testing this hypothesis by examining d'Escoubleau archives in search of clues.

=== A text long unknown ===
Victor Giraud, Charles-Henri Boudhors, George Brunet and Louis Lafuma point out that it is particularly strange that such a controversial text was not discovered until the nineteenth century. Indeed, "no one, not in Pascal's immediate circle, not in the Jansenist milieu, not among his countless readers, admirers or adversaries, in the seventeenth, eighteenth and first half of the nineteenth centuries, no one that we know of, absolutely no one, speaks of it, no one makes the slightest allusion to it". Carole Talon-Hugon confirms that "there is nothing in Pascal's work that resembles a treatise on the passions ". The Discours sur les passions de l'amour may nevertheless, in certain respects, be unfavourable to Jansenist doctrine, just as it may be favourable to its detractors – the Jesuits – or to Pascal's own. Apart from the importance it could have had for the various religious parties for the vision it gives of Pascal, in view of the notoriety the scholar enjoyed during his lifetime and at an early age, it seems hard to imagine that no one would have mentioned it apart from the copyist who added the words "on l'attribue à M. Pascal" ("it is attributed to M. Pascal"). Even Voltaire, who was opposed to Pascal, says nothing on the subject, even though he blithely spread rumours about the marriage of Bishop Jacques-Bénigne Bossuet.

Charles Adam, Gustave Michaut and Ernest Jovy put forward the argument of religious censorship (Note: Gustave Michaut, quoted by Louis Lafuma.) to justify the fact that the text remained unknown for so long. Ernest Jovy (Note: Ernest Jovy, quoted by Louis Lafuma.) points out, for example, that all Pascal's papers were subjected to examination and re-reading, and that it is possible that those close to Pascal, both as clerics and as members of his family, wanted to discard what they considered to be unfavourable to his image, or even to eliminate all "embarrassing documents". According to Lafuma, this argument is without value since other statements by Pascal contrary to doctrine have reached the public, and it would be strange if these texts, which were nevertheless recognised as not "morally unworthy of the author of the Pensées", had been suppressed even though the originals of other more controversial texts had been preserved – even though the texts in question had not been published. Indeed, although certain "intimate writings cf pensées retranchées" or fragments not deemed to be directly related to the project of the Apologie de la religion chrétienne were excluded from publication, "all of Pascal's papers [were] considered by his family to be relics" and in any case, the copies made by Jean and Pierre Guerrier contain all of Pascal's papers found at the time of his death: notes concerning the Discours sur les passions de l'amour would necessarily have appeared in these collections.

Moreover, as Lafuma and Michaut point out, in view of the striking resemblance with certain passages in the Pensées, a resemblance which has led many critics to recognise Blaise Pascal in the text, it would have to be assumed that, if the Discours was written by Blaise Pascal, some of its elements were taken from the 1670 edition of the Pensées. However, if the Jansenists had disapproved of the Discours to the point of concealing its existence, it is unlikely that they would have wanted to take extracts from it and distribute them to the public under Pascal's name.

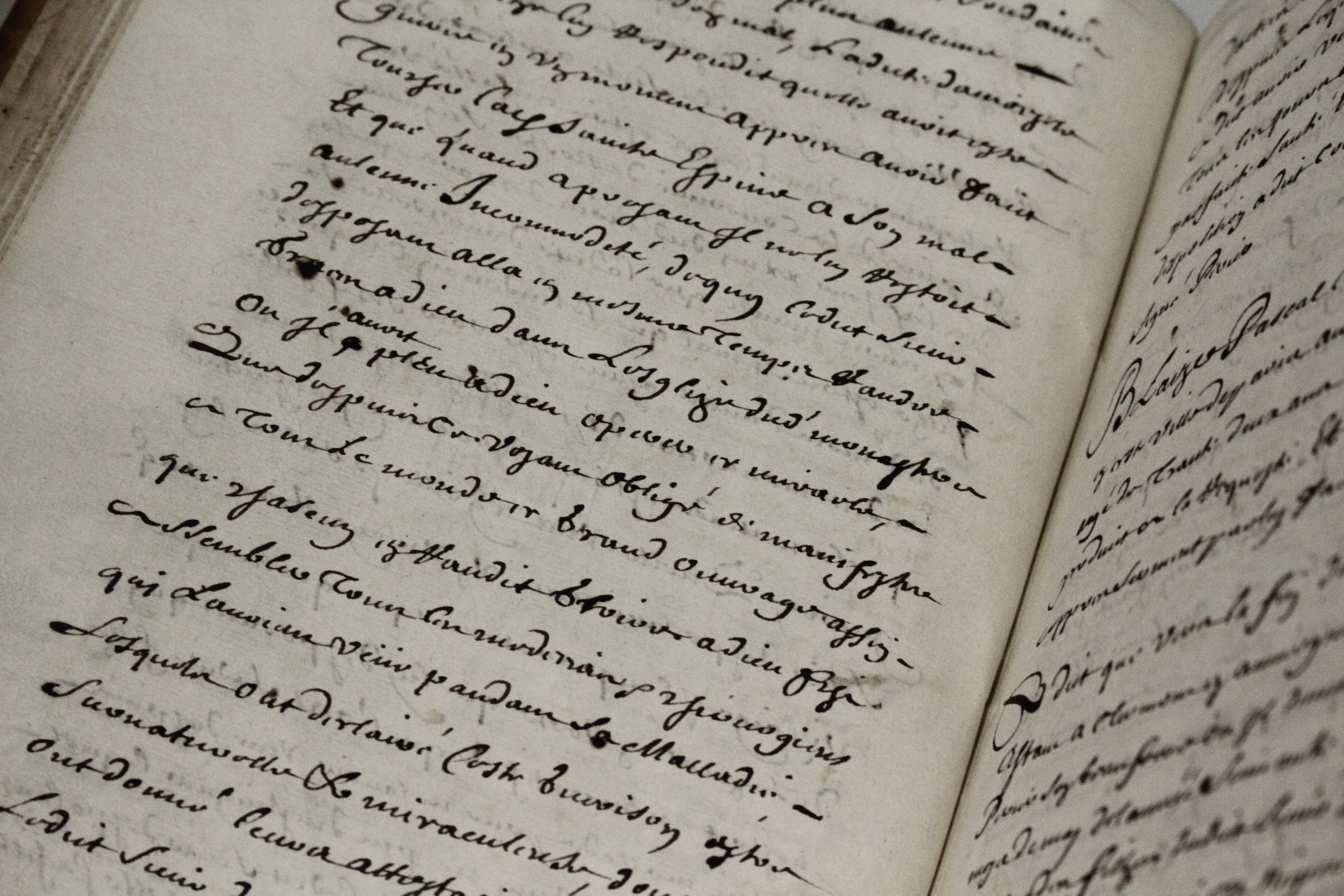
Autograph manuscript of Pascal's Pensées (1656-1662) held by the Bibliothèque nationale de France. No preparatory notes for the Discours sur les passions de l'amour appear in the collection of Pascal's papers found at his death, which suggests that he was not the author.

Moreover, none of Pascal's contemporaries, whether Valentin Conrart, Antoine Vallant, Gilles Ménage, Louis-Henri de Loménie de Brienne, or the Chevalier de Méré, mention this text, nor do the members of Pascal's immediate family. The Chevalier de Méré in particular, a witness to Pascal's social period, would, according to Boudhors, have been in a position to know whether he had produced such a text during this period – all the more so as the philosopher did write on the theme of love between 1650 and 1654, but there is no mention of any notes in connection with the Discours. Lafuma also asserts that "no notes written in view of the Discourse" are present in the fragments: there is not the slightest allusion to the text in the papers found at Pascal's death, whereas other writings, such as the Provinciales, for example, were the subject of numerous notes. From the autograph papers of Pascal that he was able to study, and on the basis of the quantity of drafts of various other texts, Lafuma asserts that the Discours should even have given rise to a fairly large quantity of notes. Nor is the fact that the Discours is not an autograph manuscript by Pascal sufficient proof, since Pascal, who was ill, must have dictated some of his writings: the fact that the Discours was dictated would not prevent the existence of preparatory notes. Even L'abrégé de la vie de Jésus-Christ, a text by Pascal which was not found until 1845 in the Château de Klarenbourg, (Note: This is a copy; the original manuscript has not been found.) was not completely unknown before that date, since it had previously been reported by Louis Périer, who deposited it at Saint-Germain-des-Prés on 25 September 1711. The fact that Pascal is not mentioned in the copy discovered by Augustin Gazier in 1907 is another point worth noting.

== Enthusiasm of the Pascaliens ==
=== Lack of scientific rigour ===
Too much enthusiasm can be blamed on scholars convinced of the authenticity of the Discourse. (Note: Jean Mesnard points out that "the enormous literature available on this subject is not of excellent quality" and that "impressionism dominates!") Victor Cousin first reaction, for example, was to proclaim that he "felt" Pascal: "Isn't that his ardent and haughty manner, so much spirit and so much passion, this speaking so fine and so big, this accent that I would recognize among a thousand?". Following this statement, other authors claim to recognize the writing and thinking of Blaise Pascal in the Discourse. Henri Jacoubet declares that the text is a reflection of "his movement, his pressing and imperious interrogations, his carelessness with repetitions, his conclusions with few words, peremptory and geometric". These statements show a certain subjectivity on the part of the authors affirming, just like Cousin, that they recognize Pascal in Discourse.

Another indication of a desire to believe in the authenticity of the Discours is the fact that Cousin recognizes, in the first version of his article on the Discours, that the text seems calculated; rather, he describes it as "wanted" when he republishes his article. He also does not seem to notice that the handwritten mention "It is attributed to Pascal" presents, as Henri Jacoubet asserts, an erasure on the "l'" as if the author of this mention had hesitated. The copyist could have wanted to write, initially, "It was attributed to", but the crossed out word is "the", which rather provides information on the nature of the text which, before being titled "Discours", could have referred to a set of texts or maxims.

Even recognized literary critics can admit that their recognition of Pascal's style is mainly subjective, as Émile Faguet does in the commentary on his edition of the Discourse: "this is in no way scientific; it is entirely literary and therefore unintellectual". Victor Giraud also insists on the difficulty of being able to judge an author by reading him without knowing his identity and elements of his life: "you have to know the true feelings of a soul to find them through his language; and, to have the right to affirm that the Discourse on the Passions of Love is the work of a lover, one would also have to know that the author of the Discours was truly in love."

For Charles-Henri Boudhors, precise research is necessary in order to objectively determine whether or not the text is by Pascal without being limited to impressions alone. This is what, according to Boudhors and certain critics such as Victor Giraud, Henri Peyre, or Henri Jacoubet, Gustave Lanson brilliantly achieved. The article written by Lanson in The French Quarterly is even described by Henri Peyre as "masterful" and "a model of method in literary history". The evidence put forward in terms of style is in fact sometimes considered insufficient, as is the case for Armand-Prosper Faugère, accused of having let himself get carried away and of having imagined a story of thwarted love between Charlotte de Roannez and Blaise Pascal. This is perceived as a "pure construction of the mind, (...) which does not have the slightest plausibility" by authors such as Antoine Adam, who positions himself against the authenticity of the Discourse.

=== Pascal's novel ===
==== Blaise Pascal's perception ====
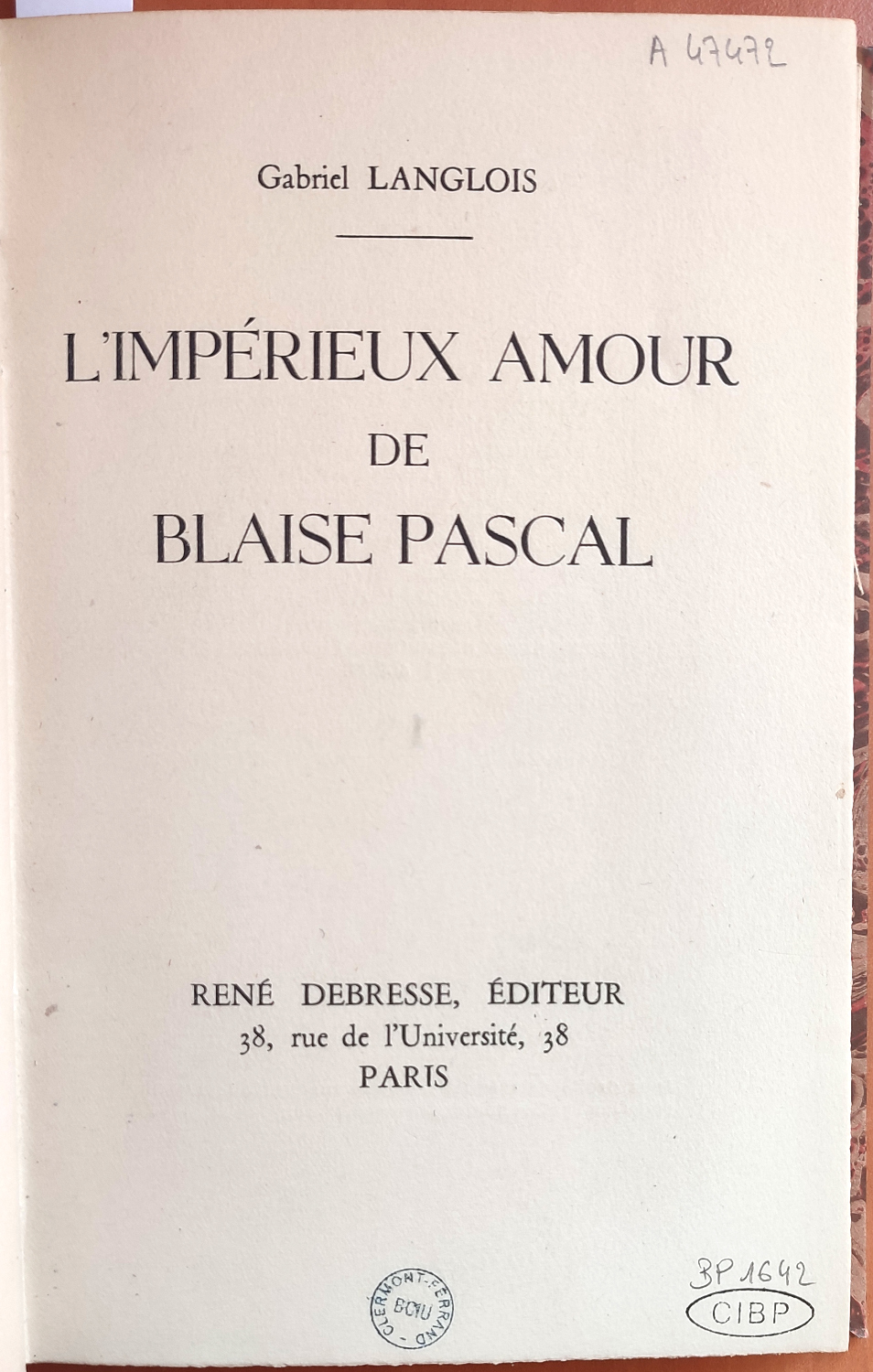
Title page of the work The Imperious Love of Blaise Pascal (1946), by Gabriel Langlois, which includes the Discourse on the Passions of Love and a biography of Blaise Pascal. Langlois attributes the Discours to Pascal and assumes it was largely inspired by the philosopher's feelings towards Charlotte de Roannez.

According to Victor Giraud, the publication of the text by Victor Cousin, accompanied by a very romanticized description of the philosopher, had a great influence on the way in which critics and the public represented Pascal: "I do not believe that before the publication, by Victor Cousin, here, of the Discourse on the Passions of Love, we have never seriously considered believing or saying that Pascal was in love." For Sainte-Beuve, for example, "it is too clear [that Pascal] never placed his soul in a creature" and that he "only loved his Savior with passion". Sainte-Beuve indulgence towards the philosopher's worldly period also reinforces the idea that it could diminish the esteem in which people of letters have him. (Note: This also seems to be the case with Louis Lafuma, for whom Lanson's words that "the Discourse is not the work of a Jansenist, of a devotee ... the author is a fine secular spirit, a worldly man, an epicurean" prove precisely that it cannot be Pascal, even though his worldly period is known, though not in detail since it has not been the subject of autobiographical accounts. Even at the time of the events, she continued to give Pascal a very mixed reputation. His sister Jacqueline wrote to him, for example, in her letter of 19 January 1655: "It seems to me that you deserved in many ways to be bothered for a while longer by the scent of the quagmire that you had embraced so eagerly". However, while Jacqueline strongly condemned his attitude and tried to bring him back to a lifestyle closer to the religious ideal, Pascal's actions were largely mitigated by the testimonies of Jansenists, including his other sister, Gilberte Périer.) Augustin Gazier, for his part, mocks the romanticized vision of Pascal given by the critics and authors of what he calls the "Pascal novel". For him, if Pascal is indeed the author of the Discours, it should in no case be seen as a confession or proof of feelings but a simple intellectual exercise: "if Corneille did not need to be Roman emperor to make Augustus speak like a true master of the universe, Pascal was able, without being in love, to analyze with astonishing precision the various passions of love. Critics convinced that the Discours is by Pascal nevertheless perceive the text as a passionate testimony, even as a confession.

Indeed, if some Pascalians judge the text contrary to Pascal's personality or to the image they have of the scholar, others see no incompatibility between the religious Pascal and the worldly or loving Pascal. The Discours, on the contrary, satisfies an expectation by adding the character of Pascal in love to the scientist and the religious. As for Giraud, "That Pascal was truly in love would not diminish him in my eyes – quite the contrary. It would not even displease me in the slightest – were I to be accused of a little persistent romanticism – if the author of the Pensées, who knew and experienced all the great sentiments of humanity, had also known this one, before making the sacrifice to his God. His 'case' would perhaps be more significant and more complete ...". Alexandre Vinet also accepts this vision of the writer (Note: In his Études sur Pascal, he writes: "In the meantime, we love that he knew love in this purity, and that he knew it".) just like Armand-Prosper Faugère, who deplores on the other hand the way in which Victor Cousin presents it and the fact that he questioned the identity of the person concerned by the Discours, a question too trivial for his taste. However, it is a question that we find in de Lescure, who sees in the text a "short fragment whose autobiographical character bursts forth in each line, (...) a charming and painful masterpiece". He also recalls that Pascal would have had the plan to marry and found a family, as revealed by Marguerite Périer herself but the event of November 23, 1654 which gave rise to the Memorial diverted him from this track. The words of Cousin who describes Pascal as "young, handsome, full of languor and ardor, impetuous and thoughtful, superb and melancholic", a declaration mainly due to the imagination of its author, are part of this perception of Pascal. For Lucien-Anatole Prévost-Paradol, "Pascal in love did not stop being a Christian and a philosopher". The poet Louise-Victorine Ackermann dedicates a poem to Blaise Pascal, the third stanza of which entitled "The Unknown" refers to the woman he would have loved. This does not entirely contradict Victor Giraud, for whom "the idea of a Pascal in love comes after the discovery of the Discours on the Passions of Love, comes from (...) of this very discovery ..."

This vision of Pascal likely to have experienced profane love gives rise to another argument raised against the authenticity of the Discourse. Pascal's personality as perceived by his literary critics is incompatible with the silence kept on this question: "Pascal as we know him, if Pascal had loved, really loved (...), he would not have loved at all. half (...); he would have given himself entirely; his "great soul" would only have been capable of "violent love"; all the ardor of his nature, of his "spirit so lively and active", all the passion of his sensitivity would have been carried out, would have passed into this new passion, as they have passed into all the simultaneous or successive passions which shared his all-too-short existence." In other words, it seems impossible to them that Pascal could be in love and not express himself in a text of very uncertain origin, of which no trace has been found among the writer's papers, and which some consider to be cold and intellectual. For Sainte-Beuve on the contrary, it is precisely because the Discours attests, according to him, to too much reasoning and reflection, and to more interest in love than expression of this feeling (Note: Henri Jacoubet "[sees] in this speech even more reasoning and desire to love than love".) that Pascal in is certainly the author, although he acknowledges in his Port-Royal that certain passages seem to have been written "from nature" and that Pascal may have had "an inclination" for a woman of a higher social class.

==== The inspiration for the Discourse ====
With fragile health made worse by his scientific activities, Pascal was advised to rest. What follows is a so-called mundane period extending from October 1651 until November 1654, (Note: Victor Giraud, in an article published in 1907 in La Revue des deux mondes, puts the date at 1649.) during which Pascal frequented the Roannez, whom he met around 1635 when his father moved to Paris, and became their neighbor. In particular, he shared the company of Artus Gouffier, Duke of Roannez, whom he ended up directing towards religion. He is even offered a room in his private mansion.

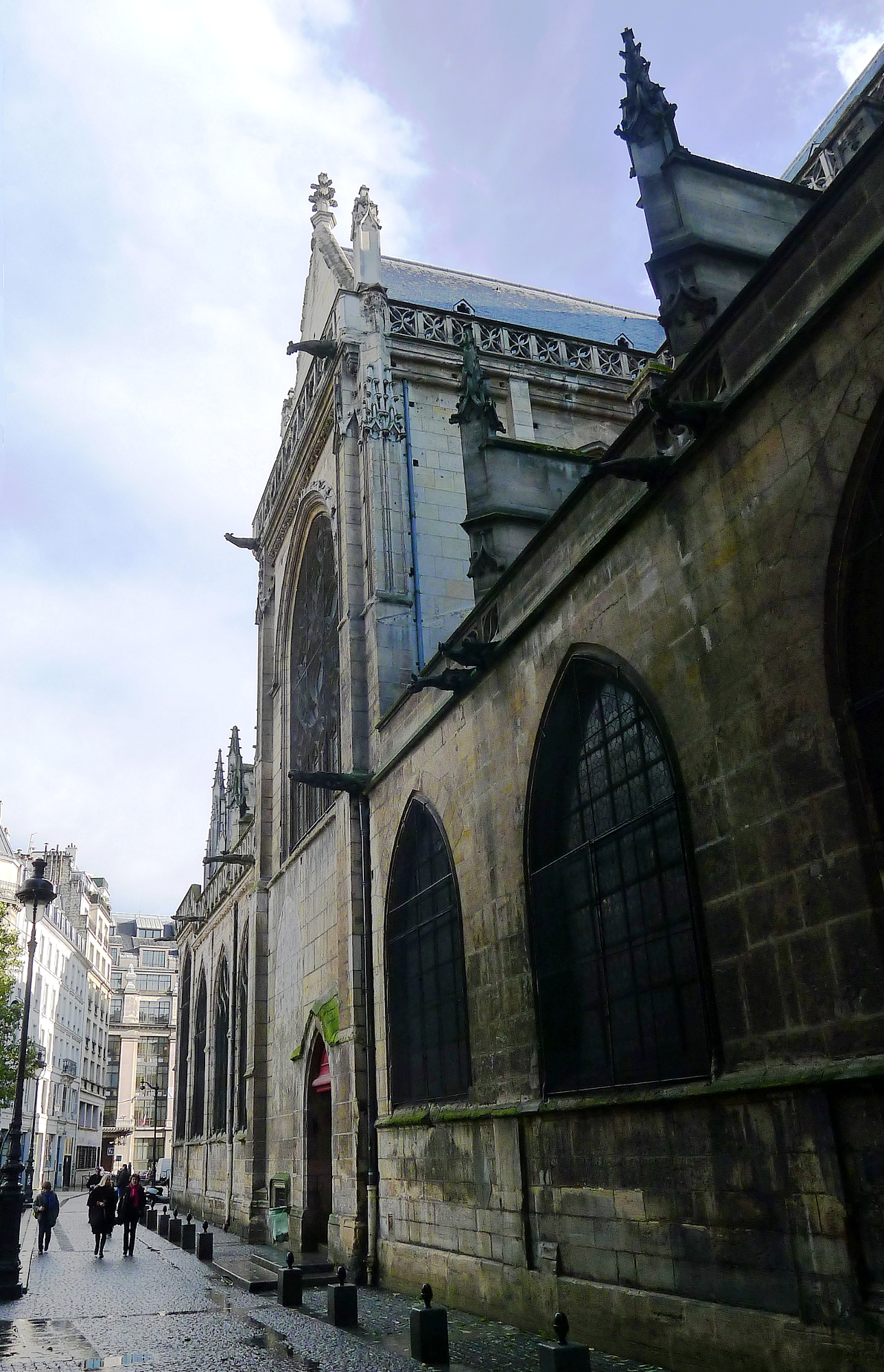
View of the church of Saint-Merri, rue du Cloître-Saint-Merri (Paris IV), where the Roannez mansion once stood

Pascal also became close to Artus Gouffier's sister, Charlotte de Roannez, to whom he also served as a spiritual guide, as evidenced by what remains of their correspondence. Victor Cousin, in his Report to the French Academy on the need for a new edition of Pascal's works, underlines the borrowing by the Port-Royal publishing committee of certain fragments of the Pensées, perhaps even all those from the file entitled "Miracles", to letters from Pascal to Miss de Roannez.

In view of the tone of the Discourse, which for some evokes a confession, and the known elements of Pascal's life with regard to the Roannez, researchers like Adolphe de Lescure and especially Armand-Prosper Faugère thought that Charlotte Gouffier de Roannez was the inspiration for the text, that is to say the woman with whom Pascal would have been in love. The passage "when one loves a lady without equality of condition" in particular, for some refers to this young woman, from a wealthier background than that of Blaise Pascal. Faugère is criticized for letting his imagination run wild and "composing the novel" of Pascal when he supports this hypothesis. However, unlike Armand-Prosper Faugère or Adolphe de Lescure, Victor Cousin and Jean-Pierre Gaxie in no way support that she could have been the inspiration for the Discourse, being precisely too far from Pascal by her social condition. in addition to being "very young and reserved for God or more considerable parties". This argument is brushed aside by de Lescure, who lists the personalities having united despite class differences and considers Cousin's demonstration as weak with regard to Pascal's loved one, in particular because she is mainly seen from the angle of marriage, which de Lescure does not consider relevant.

De Lescure even supposes, like Prosper Faugère, that Pascal would have turned to religion to console himself for an impossible union with Charlotte de Roannez and affirms that the letters he sent to her were intended to distance her from the world – and a possible union – by encouraging her to become a nun: "This is why Pascal, whose love for Mademoiselle de Roannez encountered insurmountable obstacles in the world and who could not open up to his passion At the end of the marriage, he withdrew from the world and did everything to remove Mlle de Roannez from it. (...) He pushed her towards the cloister, at the same time as he plunged into the solitude of a fierce retreat. (...) This destiny, in a word, was to be conquered for God by Pascal, who thus avenged himself or consoled himself for not having been able to conquer it for himself." De Lescure shares Faugère's romanticized vision and concludes the article from which these quotes are taken by affirming that "Pascal loved Charlotte de Roannez, that he was loved by her; that not being able to marry materially before men, they married morally before God, renouncing earthly happiness, to give to their common hopes the infinite horizon of celestial happiness (...)".

For his part, Ernest Havet does not affirm that Charlotte Gouffier could have inspired Discourse: "It is clear that a woman from the great world touched Pascal's heart (...). As for guessing who this woman was, that seems impossible, and something I will not try. "Émile Boutroux thinks it unlikely that Pascal would have turned to a woman almost ten years his junior. Furthermore, Victor Giraud and Augustin Gazier in no way support that Pascal could have been in love with Charlotte de Roannez, and Émile Faguet is particularly harsh towards Faugère who, according to him, demonstrates "the most buffoonish naivety [that he has] never met". Likewise, Léon Brunschvicg states that "it is certainly childish to imagine that Pascal could have been in love with Mlle de Roannez only because we do not have another name, and given the character of the letters that Pascal sent to her wrote to convert her, the conjecture becomes inappropriate as much as it is gratuitous" – the letters to Charlotte de Roannez seem to be the subject of different interpretations depending on the bias of the critics, since Faugère sees on the contrary in them "a tender solicitude that charity alone would not explain". (Note: Certain formulations in the letters are seen as ambiguous, meaning that they do not refer solely to faith, such as "Il est bien assuré qu'on ne se détache jamais sans douleur", quoted by Jean-Piere Gaxie in the preface to his edition of the Discourse.) Gabriel Langlois goes even further and assumes that not only was Charlotte de Roannez the mistress of Blaise Pascal, but that, under the assumed name of Anne Charmat, she also had a child with him recognized by Pascal in 1653 He would have actually confused Blaise Pascal, the scholar, with one of his homonymous uncles. The existence of this child is invalidated by Blaise Pascal's refusal in 1653 of a donation from Port-Royal, precisely because he had no children.

Victor Giraud does not accept "Pascal's novel" either: unlike Émile Faguet or Faugère, he affirms that Pascal was only able to meet Charlotte de Roannez around August 1656, and that his plan to enter Port-Royal initially had nothing to do with the influence of the philosopher – that it was his brother, Artus Gouffier, who encouraged Pascal to write him the letters in which he enjoins her to become a nun. (Note: According to Augustin Gazier, Charlotte de Roannez's pilgrimage to Port-Royal in June 1656, to worship the Sainte-Épine associated with the cure of Marguerite Périer and to cure herself of a problem affecting her eyes, did not immediately encourage her to become a nun. He reports the testimony of Canon Godefroi Hermant, according to whom it was during her second pilgrimage, in August 1656, that Charlotte de Roannez expressed her intention to become a nun.) He offers another reconstruction of Pascal's life: alone following the death of his father, the marriage of his sister Gilberte to Florin Périer and the entry of his other sister, Jacqueline, into the convent, Pascal would have felt a "great void" and a "mystical drought" that he needed to fill, hence his marriage plan.

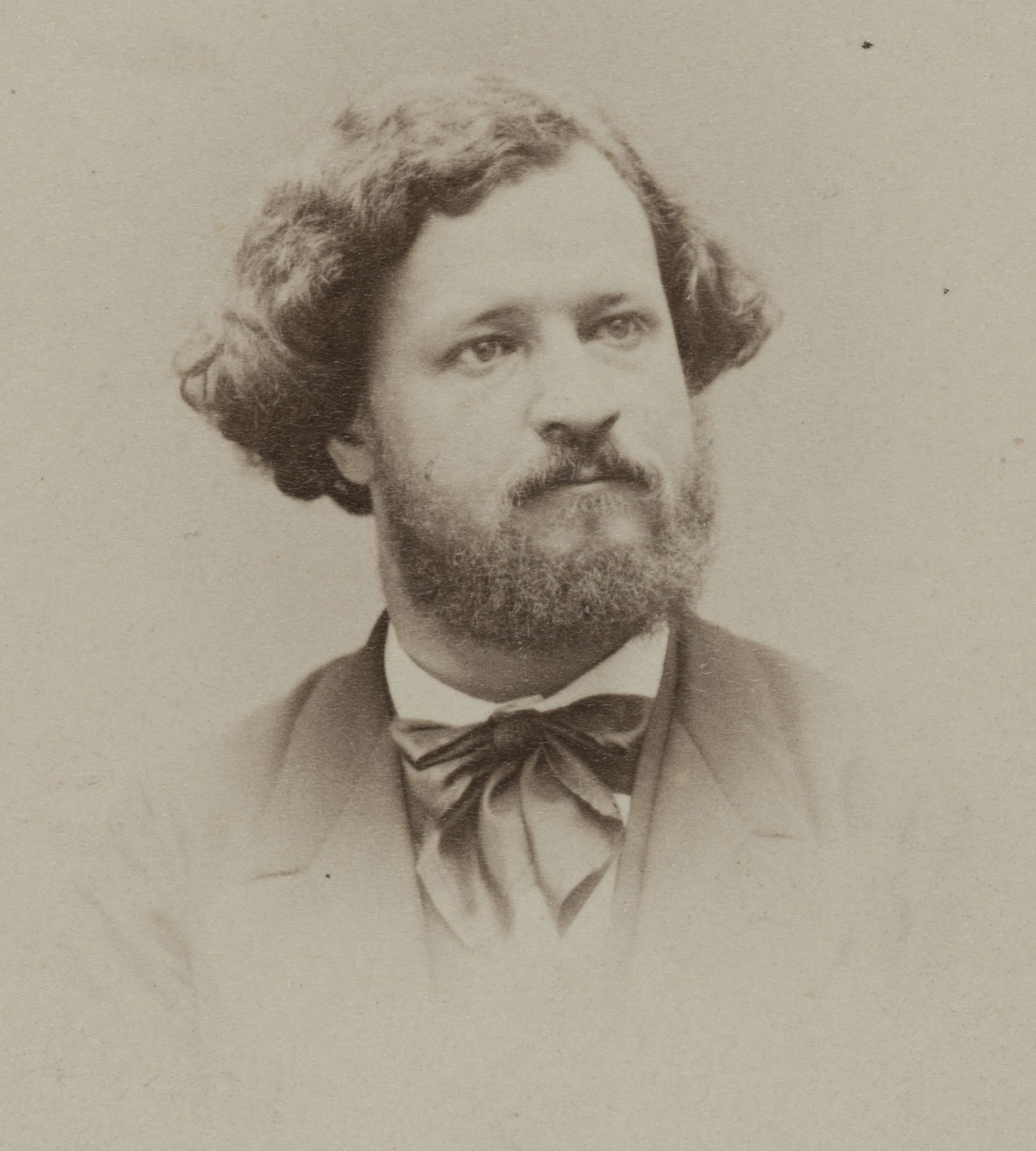
Portrait of Adolphe de Lescure, one of the critics who contributed to fleshing out "Pascal's novel"

If Charlotte de Roannez did not have the link with Blaise Pascal that Faugère or Langlois imagine, it is clear that she was linked with him by faith: she would have asked that the letters received from Pascal be transmitted to Port-Royal. Her husband, the Duke of La Feuillade, refused and had them burned. Furthermore, although Pascal's letters to Charlotte de Roannez are not, for Gazier for example, entirely responsible for her plan to become a nun, the Roannez family is extremely hostile towards Blaise Pascal, to the point that the scholar misses being stabbed by their concierge while he is staying in the apartments that Artus Gouffier reserves for him in his mansion. According to Victor Cousin, it was the fact of having pushed Charlotte towards religion and thus indirectly diverting her from her marriage plan which earned her this attempt, but Augustin Gazier explained in 1877 in La Revue politique et littéraire that the reason for this assassination attempt lies rather in the fact of having contributed to distracting Artus Gouffier from his family's plan to have him marry Mlle de Menus.

Beyond the differences in social classes and the various interpretations made of the letters to Charlotte de Roannez and the Discours, a major argument is raised against "Pascal's novel": the scientist having already enjoyed great fame during his lifetime, those who do not not believing in a possible story between Pascal and Charlotte de Roannez argue that such facts would necessarily have been known and reported. However, no concrete testimony exists on this subject, and Victor Giraud already affirmed, at the beginning of the 20th century, that "there is no one today who seriously maintains that Pascal was in love with Mlle de Roannez. All those who believed in this legend and who propagated it – Faugère, de Lescure, Ricard, Derôme and Molinier – are dead, and, as it seems to me, the legend with them".

If everyone does not agree on the identity of the person who inspired the Discours, either it is not Pascal, or it is not Charlotte de Roannez, Victor Cousin and Frédéric Fuzet question about a Clermontoise mentioned in Fléchier Memoirs on the great days of Auvergne, in 1665, who could have frequented Pascal's circle. The author suggests that Pascal would have, like other eminent scholars, frequented "the finest and liveliest mind there is in the city (...) loved by all there was of beautiful spirits. Mr. Pascal (...), and another scholar were continually near this beautiful scholar." This allusion is also mentioned by Jacoubet, who of the "most innocent friendships" mentioned by Gilberte Périer in her Life of M. Pascal. Maurice Deyras also refers to these Memoirs while remaining moderate: Pascal apparently stayed in Clermont during the winter of 1652-1653, and "would have shown himself to be very attentive to the precious young people of Clermont". Although Cousin and Fuzet are not the only ones to note this anecdote, Faugère like Giraud emphasize that it is certainly a mistake: according to an editor of these Mémoires, Benoît Gonod, Fléchier confuses a certain Jeanne Enjobert, herself married to an Étienne Pascal, with the mother of Blaise Pascal, Antoinette Begon. The one who assiduously frequented the young woman mentioned would therefore not be Blaise Pascal, the scholar, but his homonymous cousin, financial secretary advisor. (Note: XXX)

== Vocabulary, writing style and ideas ==
=== Similarities with the writings of Blaise Pascal ===
If declaring that an author can be recognized by his style seems to be a matter of subjectivity, as when Victor Cousin writes that "everywhere one recognizes [Pascal] hand, the geometrical spirit which never abandons him, his favorite expressions, his words of habit, his so true distinction between reasoning and feeling and a thousand other similar things which are to be found at every step in the Pensées", Gustave Michaut notes sixteen passages in the Discourse which are particularly similar to Pascal's productions. For A. Barbut, too, the style of the Discourses is entirely in keeping with that of the scholar and, when critics argue that the literary quality of the text is inferior to what Pascal could write, Jacoubet retorts that the style of the Discourse is not the same as that of Pascal. Barbut also felt that the style of the Discours was entirely in keeping with that of the scholar and, when critics argued that the literary quality of the text was inferior to anything Pascal could write, Jacoubet retorted that it could be one of his first writings, which inevitably contained errors and could not be in the same vein as the philosopher's later productions.

In addition to a vocabulary and turns of phrase close to those of Pascal, many concepts already present in the Pensées are found in this Discourse, such as the geometrical spirit and the spirit of finesse, and even certain passages that are similar to the word in the two writings. Pascal's conception of love as a function of the mind is also to be found, but Jean Mesnard likens this reasoning more to Descartes's vision. Ernest Havet, like Gustave Lanson, lists the passages in the Discours in which Pascal's original conceptions are present, as well as what he considers to be proof that the Discours is "written under the impact of a present passion" and is therefore really by Pascal. Mesnard points out that for these analyses to be relevant, it is still necessary to prove that the text of the Discours is closer to Pascal's autograph manuscripts than to the 1670 edition of the Pensées.

This is precisely what Victor Giraud attempts to do by recalling the similarities that Gustave Lanson noted between the Discours and certain passages in the original manuscript of the Pensées. The Port-Royal edition of the Pensées contains the sentence "Hence it is that men love so much the noise and tumult of the world", whereas the term "stirring up" is used in the Discourse. However, the original manuscript of the Pensées also uses the term "remuement" instead of "tumulte", proof that the author of the Discours was able to consult it. Giraud goes further: for him, the Discours cannot have been inspired by the changes made by Port-Royal to the Pensées: some expressions are in fact borrowed from the original manuscript of the Pensées and are not found in the Port-Royal edition. However, the similarities that Lanson finds between the Pensées and the Discours are, for Lafuma, mainly superficial. He notes that the borrowings from the Pensées are generally limited to the first chapters, with the exception of the Pensées diverses, which is reproduced in its entirety.

Moreover, according to Boudhors, the presence of terms that could really be attributed to Pascal, i.e. those closer to the autograph manuscripts than to the Port-Royal edition, is not surprising insofar as the committee that edited the Pensées at Port-Royal was not bound to secrecy: someone could very well have written this Discours using Pascal's own expressions. There is also evidence, in the correspondence of Brienne and Antoine Vallant, (Note: Doctor to the Marquise de Sablé, who belonged to Pascal's circle.) that they copied from their personal documents fragments, most of which do not appear in the Port-Royal edition and did not even appear until later, such as fragment Br.44 published in 1779 by Bossut. (Note: "If you want people to think well of you, don't say so".)

=== Notable differences ===
The Discours contains words and turns of phrase that Pascal rarely, if ever, used: as Boudhors points out, it would be surprising if they all appeared in the same text. The title itself, as Lafuma points out, seems far removed from Pascal's usual turns of phrase by its lack of precision, to which Gustave Michaut replies that the text could, as in the case of many writings found in Pascal's papers, have been modified and the title added a posteriori by Port-Royal.

Researchers have also noted a certain confusion between the vocabulary used in the Discours and that used by Pascal: in Pascal's work, the word "esprit" is used most often to designate what others call "âme". Similarly, in the Pensées, Pascal uses the term "remuement" in the sense of external agitation, whereas in the Discours, the same term evokes internal agitation, as thought by Malebranche.

The use of the personal pronoun "je" is also foreign to Pascal, and the expression "avec soi" is only found in the Port-Royal edition and not in the autograph manuscripts.

== Influences of the Discours ==
=== Philosophical and literary works ===
While one of the arguments in favor of the Discourse's authenticity is that the concepts invoked in the text can only lead back to Pascal, Ferdinando Néri (Note: quoted by Jacoubet, 1938.) points out that they are quite simply those of the century. A comparison is quickly made between the Discours and several key literary and philosophical works of the seventeenth and eighteenth centuries, several of which were not published until after Pascal's death in 1662. Jean de La Bruyère, the Chevalier de Méré, to whom the Discours has even been attributed, and Nicolas Malebranche are considered to be the main inspires of the text.

La Rochefoucauld Maxims seem to have inspired the author(s) of the Discourse. For example, the maxim "À force de parler d'amour, on devient amoureux" ("By dint of talking about love, one becomes in love") in the Discours has similarities with La Bruyère's maxim, "There are people who would never have been in love if they had never heard of love". As far as La Bruyère is concerned, the phrase "Qu'une vie est heureuse quand elle commence par l'amour et qu'elle finit par l'ambition!" is undeniably reminiscent of the line in the Characters, "Men begin with love, end with ambition".

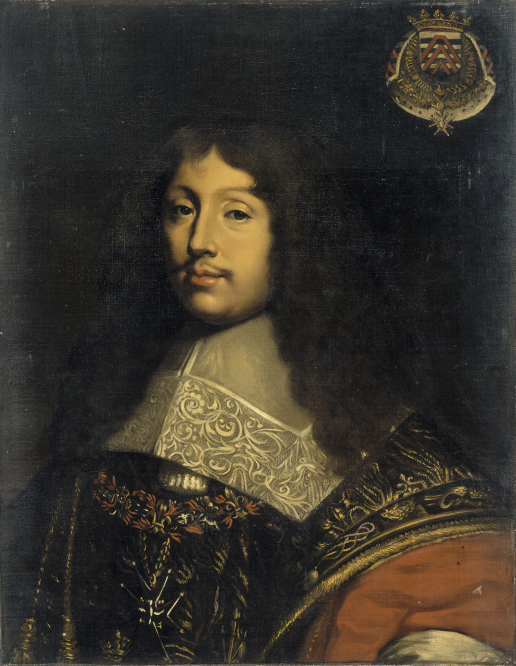
Portrait of the Duke François de La Rochefoucauld (1613-1680), one of the inspirers of the author of the Discourse, by Théodore Chassériau (1836)

Nicolas Malebranche is one of the most identifiable influences on the Discours sur les passions de l'amour. This would be one of the most convincing arguments for saying that the text was not written by Pascal, since the Recherche de la Vérité, the work with which the Discours has the most similarities, did not appear until 1674, twelve years after Pascal's death. Book V of the Recherche in particular, devoted to the "passions of the soul", is even considered by Lafuma to be the main inspiration for the text, so striking are the similarities. He considers that the Discours resembles this work as much as the 1670 edition of the Pensées.

Descartes's Traité des passions de l'âme, and in particular his reuse of Plato's Banquet and the myth of the androgyne, can also be found in the Discourse. However, the rest of the Discours takes a different approach to the androgynous myth, defining the heart as the seat of the passions instead of the brain – and more specifically the pineal gland – in Descartes. Descartes's thought, as assimilated by Malebranche, can also be found in the Discourse, and the opening line of the text, "Man was born to think", evokes Descartes's "cogito ergo sum".

In literature, novels such as Logique des amants by de Callières fils (1688) could also have been a source of inspiration for the Discourse, as could L'Astrée by Honoré d'Urfé and the Dialogue de l'amour et de la raison by René Le Pays (1664), for the opposition between love and reason. Precious love as found in the Carte du tendre inspired by Mme de Scudéry's novel Clélie, histoire romaine is also one of the influences noted by researchers.

=== Trade fairs ===
Far from being a uniform text, the Discours seems to be a compilation of answers to questions of love, a game of gallant wit in vogue in salons and social circles, hence the disjointed appearance of the text. It was common practice in the seventeenth century to meet in salons and propose a theme or a portrait on which the participants would discuss; these answers could then be collected in writing. (Note: Fortunat Strwoski supports the hypothesis that the Discourse is at most the record of one of these discussions, which Pascal may have attended.) An issue of l'Extraordinaire, the predecessor of the Mercure galant founded by Donneau de Visé, even gives the example of such a game with the instruction to take time to think: the Discours could be the result of a similar game, so much so that the answers seem to Brunet to have been worked out rather than spontaneous.

According to Abbé Flottes, the text is similar to the productions of the Hôtel de Rambouillet, a literary salon run by Catherine de Vivonne from 1620 to 1660. Victor Cousin himself notes that the "subject seems more borrowed from the Hôtel de Rambouillet than from Port-Royal". The salon of the Marquise de Lambert and that of Mme de Sablé are also likely sources: La Rochefoucauld Maximes, the inspiration for the Discours, were discussed in the salon of the Marquise de Sablé, sometimes even by correspondence, before being published. The Discours may have followed the same route.

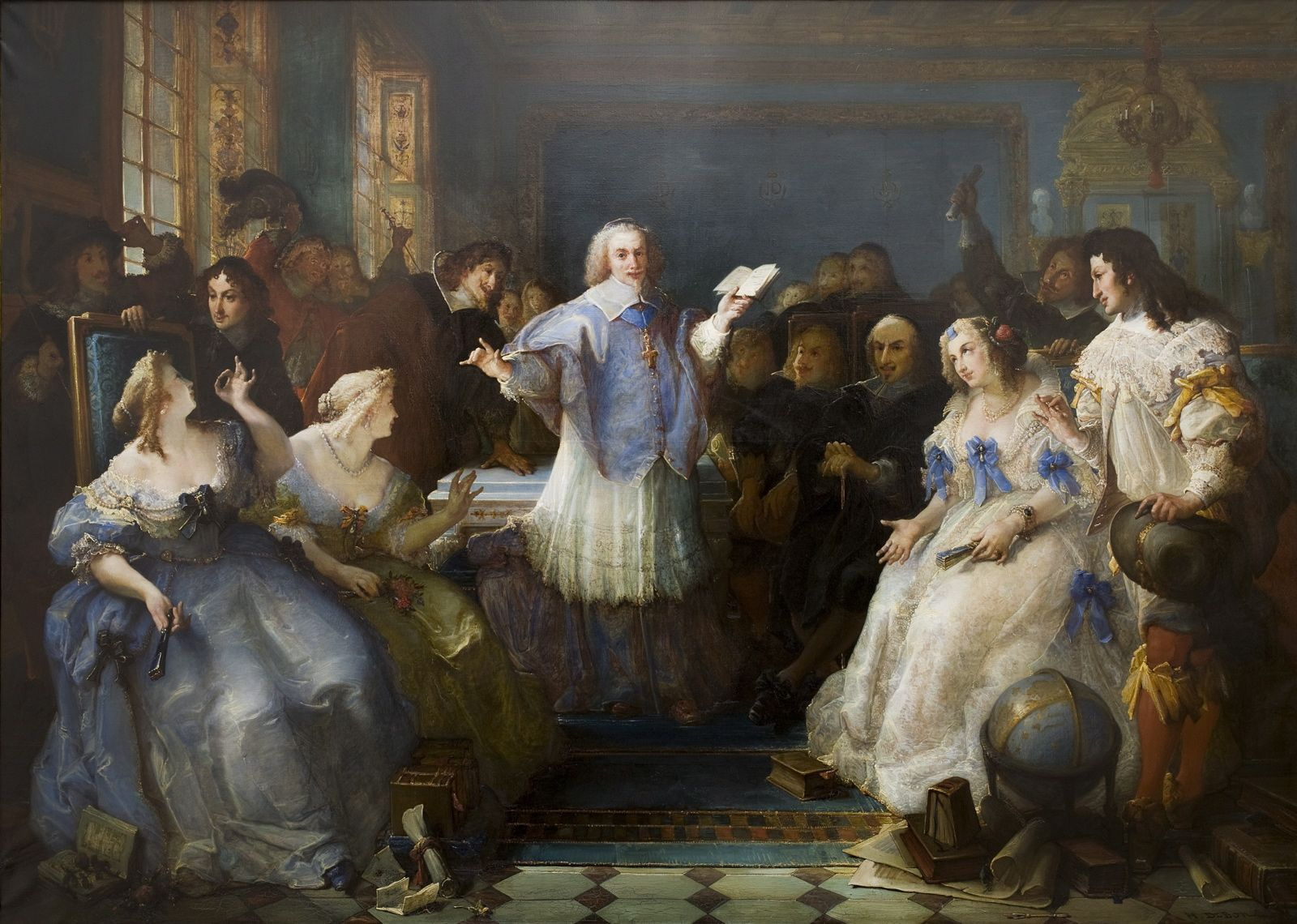
Hôtel de Rambouillet, François-Hippolyte Debon, 1863, Musée d'art et d'histoire de Dreux

An examination of Henriette de Coligny de la Suze Recueil des pièces galantes en prose et en vers, which contains "Maximes d'amour ou questions en proses décidées en verses", shows that the Discours sur les passions de l'amour appears to be a response to these questions, or at least to very similar ones. The Discours also bears a strong resemblance to a section of the collection entitled "L'amour raisonnable". Around ten editions of the Recueil were published between 1663 and 1680, as jeu d'esprit was very much in vogue in the salons around 1660, and if, as Gustave Lanson asserts, the author of the Discours was a salon-going socialite, it is not surprising to find similarities between the Recueil des pièces galantes and the Discours, both in terms of content and form. The author may even have frequented Mme de Sablé's salon, where he met Pascal.

Julie de Lespinasse, a woman of letters and lady-in-waiting to the Marquise du Deffand, also founded her own salon, where she welcomed the Encyclopaedists. From May 1773 to March 1776 she corresponded with the Comte de Guibert, in which she expressed a vision of love-passion very close to that of the Discours: such conceptions are indeed the hallmark of this period and can be attributed to literary figures other than Blaise Pascal.

George Brunet's Un prétendu traité de Pascal is not only an attempt to trace the history of the Discours and manuscripts C and G, but also to restore their historical context. It contains a repertory of "questions d'amour", with the questions, answers and works from which they are taken.

Despite the various comparisons made by researchers between the Discours and the various collections of "questions d'amour" produced in the seventeenth and eighteenth centuries, such as the repertory compiled by George Brunet containing questions, their answers and the works from which they are taken, these comparisons are sometimes criticized for being "vague".

== A text probably written after Blaise Pascal death ==
For critics convinced of the Discours authenticity, the text would have been written during Pascal social period, i.e. 1652-1653 or more broadly 1651-1654, the influence of the Chevalier de Méré on the text being one of the arguments put forward. However, researchers who have set out to find the author of the Discours have noted borrowings from texts written after the philosopher's death on 19 August 1662. The popularity of the Pensées is often invoked to explain the similarities between Pascal's texts and the Discours.

The maxim "C'est de là que ceux de la cour sont mieux reçus dans l'amour que ceux de la ville", for example, tends to date the Discours after 1660: several critics point out that the opposition between "those of the court" and "those of the city" only appears around this date, a few years after Pascal's social period. Others counter this argument by saying that Pascal may well have been the originator of this distinction between "the court" and "the city". However, there are formulas in the Discours that can only have been taken from the 1670 edition of the Pensées; according to Louis Lafuma, about ten sentences out of the seventy in the Discours may have been directly inspired by this edition and the text is much closer to it than to Pascal's original manuscripts. One of the most striking examples is the fragment "Por XXVI", actually written by one of the members of the Port-Royal publishing committee, which met after Pascal's death. Similarly, the changes made to the Pensées by the committee could even, according to Gustave Michaut, have been inspired by passages in the original manuscript of the Discours, to which some of the members may have had access. This would explain why at least three passages in the Discours are closer to the original manuscript of the Pensées than to the 1670 edition. Some passages in the Discours cannot be Pascal's, since they are borrowed from fragments that were unpublished until discovered in 1728 by Bossuet and Faugère.

Certain expressions also suggest that the Discourse was written after 1662. The use of "l'on" rather than "on", which was discouraged by the Académie in the seventeenth century until around 1688, when Furetière died, is a formulation frequently found in La Bruyère's Caractères, whose fifth edition, published in 1690, has similarities with the Discours which suggest that the two texts were written at the same time.

The Discourse also deals with a conception of "love-passion" after Pascal's death, unlike that found in Descartes, where "love-passion", if it exists at all, is defeated by reason. This conception is also found in Racine, Madame de Lafayette and Guilleragues. Malebranche's influence is more obvious than Descartes's, particularly when he speaks of passions "occasioned by the body", whereas Descartes said they were "caused". Similarly, the idea of the mind as a container, and the fact of speaking of "capacity", as in the maxim "the heart of man is so great that small things float in its capacity", are among the undeniable borrowings from the Search for Truth, a work published in 1674.

== Several authors? ==
The hypothesis of Henriot, Boudhors and Brunet that the Discours is in fact the transcription of a worldly dialogue would justify the perception of several voices in the text. One of the characteristics of the text that has led other Pascalians such as Jean Pommier and George Brunet to support this idea is the apparent lack of logic in the sequence of maxims, which has led to the hypothesis of a record of gallant conversations. To this Gustave Michaut replies that the text, which may have been reconstituted by Port-Royal from scattered notes by Pascal, is no more incoherent than those dealing with the misery of man or the relationship between justice and force, but Louis Lafuma points out that for the purposes of his argument, not only does Gustave Michaut assume without proof the existence of a bundle, but he goes further by suggesting that fragments relating to this Discours sur les passions de l'amour may have been, like Pascal's papers in the Recueil Original, rearranged and pasted into another collection, again without putting forward any proof.

In addition to these different voices, Boudhors distinguishes two tones in the text: one rather didactic, and the other rather melancholic, which evokes for him a confidence or a confession. The Discours seems in fact to contain a section tracing the history of love, divided by Émile Faguet between the theory of entertainment and the theory of life divided into love and ambition, and one bringing together answers to questions about love in vogue in the literary salons. He analyses these different tones as stemming from the fact that Pascal's work is a work of art. He analyses these different tones as coming from a single person, Pascal, in whom the philosopher and the lover argue. However, Brunet's analysis shows the existence of contradictions in the text which, according to him, can only be due to different arguments presented to the same questions (Note: Having several partners, sometimes presented as "natural", sometimes as "monstrous", is one example.) and lead him to identify several authors. (Note: As far back as 1920, Fortunat Strowski identified several authors in the text, including at least three different ones on the first page alone)

Among them is at least one woman, identified as "source H". She frequently uses the word "great" in several of its meanings: "in a great soul everything is great"; "a great and clear mind loves with ardour"; "great souls are not those who love most often". This person is also insinuating that, since love has to be "great", it can only have a high-ranking person as its object. This could be similar to what Charles-Henri Boudhors suggests when he points out a notable difference between the two manuscript versions of the Discourse: manuscript G speaks of finding the object of one's affection below one's station rather than above it. (Note: In manuscript G, "Néanmoins l'on va quelquefois bien au-dessus" becomes "Néanmoins l'on ira quelquefois au-dessous".) For Boudhors, it is very likely that a woman conceived this idea, since women were much more likely than men to have suitors from the upper social classes. He takes Louis XIV and Madame de Scarron as examples. Georges Brunet also assumes that one or more women may have been behind formulas such as "il n'y a que nous d'estimables" or "c'est parfois au jeu auquel les dames se plaisent".

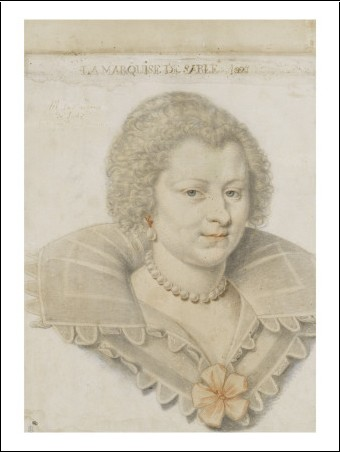
The Marquise de Sablé, a woman of letters whose salon Blaise Pascal frequented. The Discours could be the record of one of the gallant conversations in vogue in the salons of the seventeenth century, which would explain the contradictions and different "voices" found in the text.

This source H would be a literate person, in whose remarks Brunet distinguishes references to Descartes, Pascal and Malebranche but criticizes their superficiality and judges that they are more interested in dazzling their audience than in philosophizing. However, as far as the text as a whole is concerned, he considers source H to be the most important, given the length of his contribution on the one hand and the fact that the other sources seem to respond to him on the other. H seems to be the main material of the Discourse, which is commented on and discussed by the other sources. A primitive text consisting solely of the maxims attributable to source H might even have existed at first and been enriched on the occasion of a reading in an assembly.

"Source N", far from emphasizing reasoning and judgement, supports the role of nature and intuition, and even radically opposes art and culture on the one hand and nature and spontaneous feeling on the other: "Nature has imprinted this truth so well on our souls that we find it ready-made: no art or study is needed". This same person seems to be responding to the first person quoted, source H.

Next comes "source P": for Brunet, this is probably a man who seems to back up his assertions with his own experience. He often refers to "joy" and "suffering", or "fullness" and "anxiety", contrasting them in the same maxim.

"Source A", on the other hand, contrasts love and ambition and frequently uses oppositional adverbs such as "but", "nevertheless" and "however" within the same maxim. She seems to make corrections to her first statement as she develops.

"Source E" is the one whose assertions have led some critics to recognise Blaise Pascal for his opposition between geometric spirit and spirit of finesse. Critics who do not believe in the authenticity of the Discourse think that these ideas were borrowed from Pascal, and in particular from chapter XXXI of the Port-Royal edition entitled "Pensées diverses". In addition to Pascal, La Rochefoucauld, Donneau de Visé, and La Bruyère are cited among his influences. Nevertheless, Brunet notes certain contradictions in the references to l'esprit de finesse and l'esprit géométrique, to such an extent that he suggests that the maxims he attaches to "source E" could have come from sources P and N, if some of the subjects it refers to had not already been dealt with by those same sources.

Finally, there are still some maxims that Brunet is unable to link to any of the sources previously identified.

== Possible authors ==
=== Charles-Paul d'Escoubleau ===
Louis Lafuma asserted that the Discours was not by Pascal but by Charles Paul d'Escoubleau, who frequented Blaise Pascal's circle, i.e. the Roannez, the Méré, and Madame de Sablé, whose salon dealt with questions of love similar to those which the Discours seems to answer – a thesis which was not judged totally fanciful by Victor Giraud, who was initially sceptical about the authenticity of the text. According to Lafuma, Charles-Paul d'Escoubleau, Marquis d'Alluye et de Sourdis, was the author of two plays in the Vallant portfolio: Questions d'amour and Pourquoi l'amour est peint les yeux bandés, nud et enfant. He is also said to have considered marrying Charlotte de Roannez However, it turns out that Lafuma has confused the Marquis d'Escoubleau with his father. Jean Mesnard, for his part, claims that Lafuma is "seriously wrong" in making this attribution.

=== Antoine Gombaud, known as the Chevalier de Méré ===
The people Pascal surrounded himself with during his social period are sometimes cited as possible authors of the Discourse, such as the Chevalier de Méré. Jean Mesnard rejects this hypothesis: Méré did not have the Cartesian influences, nor the "warmth and ardour" present in the text, and it is unlikely, given the care he took with his works, that he would have left out manuscripts to the extent that some of them were not found until well after his death.

=== Louis-Henri de Loménie ===
For Jean Mesnard, the literary quality of the Discours is undeniable: the borrowings are not mere clumsy paraphrases and the different sources are "assimilated intimately enough to create something other than a centon of foreign passages". He proposed Louis-Henri de Loménie, comte de Brienne, as the likely author. (Note: This hypothesis is supported by André Comte-Sponville.) Loménie, who was close to the Périers, was not only a member of the editorial committee of the Pensées in 1668, but also compiled the discarded fragments in a collection, which could explain the similarity between some elements of the Discours and Pascal's original manuscripts. Other publishing work occupied him at the same time as the Pensées: it was he who supplied Nicolas-Joseph Poisson with a copy of Descartes's Traité de mécanique, and a collection of poems by "La Fontaine" published in 1671 with the collaboration of Arnauld d'Andilly which in fact contained poems composed by Brienne himself. Furthermore, although Mesnard emphasises the fact that the Discours belongs to a genre little treated by Brienne, he points out that there are maxims in his Nouveaux essais de morale.

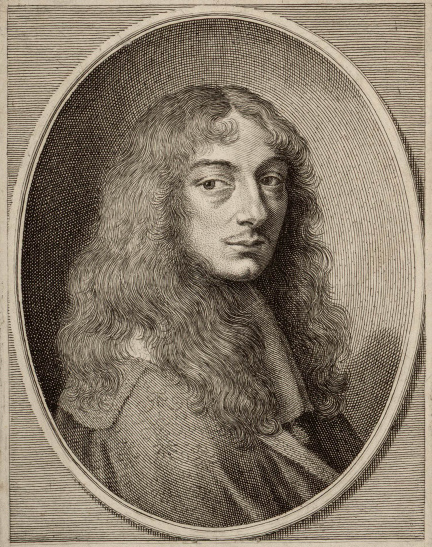
Louis-Henri de Loménie, Comte de Brienne (1635–1698)

Some expressions and turns of phrase are common to the Mémoires de Brienne and the Discours, such as the use of "caractère" to designate a form or manner of, the archaic turn of phrase "Tant plus le chemin est long en amour, tant plus un esprit délicat sent de plaisir" or the use of the word "dames" instead of "femmes", which is not found in Pascal. He was also influenced by Descartes, La Rochefoucauld, and Saint-Evremond, whom he admired, and frequented Marin Le Roy de Gomberville. Still on the subject of writing style, the "lively sensitivity" that Jean Mesnard perceives in the Discours and that critics have attributed to Pascal is for him one of Loménie's characteristics. The fact that Henri de Loménie wrote the Discours would also explain the contradictions that can be found in the text, which appear several times in his Mémoires and which he himself points out.

The path followed by the manuscript, which Mesnard has attempted to retrace, also leads back to Brienne: he may have been acquainted with some of the former owners of the manuscript discovered by Victor Cousin in 1843. Like him, Claude de Santeul stayed at the Saint-Magloire seminary, and the chancellor Louis Boucherat joined the de Loménie family through his marriage to Anne-Françoise de Loménie in 1655. Mesnard also links Brienne to Amelot de la Houssaye through their interests.

Moreover, whether or not the Discours was partly inspired by the intimate life of its author(s), several women in Brienne's life could have inspired such a text: Mme Deshoulières, Isabelle de Montmorency-Bouteville, Christine-Wilhelmine de Hesse-Hombourg, or Louise de La Vallière, favourite of Louis XIV.

The absence of any mention of Brienne in the text could be explained by the author's own wishes or by the fact that his papers were dispersed after his death and have not all survived.

== Hypothesis of deception ==
If the Discours sur les passions de l'amour is not by Pascal, it has not been determined whether it was attributed to him not on the basis of an error, but of a genuine desire to fabricate a forgery. Pascal rapidly acquired great renown, and the swindle organised in the 1860s by the forger Denis Vrain-Lucas, of which Michel Chasles was a victim, provides an example of alleged documents written by the scientist and philosopher. According to Charles Henri-Boudhors, for example, it could be that the Discourse was deliberately written in the nineteenth century to imitate an older style. He points to the differences between the two copies of the text known in the nineteenth century: the manuscript discovered by Victor Cousin in 1843 and the one discovered by Augustin Gazier in 1907: the spelling of manuscript G is more modern and "marks the end of the seventeenth century or the beginning of the next", while that of manuscript C, which is very particular, presents both contemporary and more modern spellings. In this case, either the copyist made a mistake and could not resist writing the words according to the spelling in use in the nineteenth century, or he clumsily forged a seventeenth-century spelling.

Brunet, for his part, suggests that the owner of the original from which manuscript C was copied deliberately misled the copyist, or that the copyist himself added this attribution without proof for the attention of one of his owners, Balthazar-Henri de Fourcy.

== Contemporary period ==
The question of the attribution of the Discours seems to be the subject of less literature in the twentieth century than in the century following the successive discoveries of Victor Cousin and Augustin Gazier. The work of Louis Lafuma, followed by that of Jean Mesnard, convinced critics that the text was very unlikely to have been written by Pascal 184,162. Michael Moriarty in 2006 and Thibault Barrier in 2022 point out that the attribution of the Discourse is still uncertain.

In 2022, the publication of an article in Ouest-France repeating this legend was described by the Société des amis de Port-Royal as "a tissue of historical untruths that do no credit to Pascal, and even less to Ouest-France".

== Notes and references ==
=== References ===
==== Inline Citation ====
- Ackermann, Louise-Victorine (1885). Lemerre, Alphonse (ed.). "Pascal – III: L'Inconnue" [Pascal – III: The Unknown]. Œuvres de L. Ackermann [Works by L. Ackermann] (in French). Paris: A. Lemerre. pp. 145–148 – via Wikisource.
- Adam, Charles (1 January 1891). "Pascal et Mlle de Roannez" [Pascal and Ms. de Roannez]. Revue Bourguignonne de l'enseignement supérieur [Burgundian Journal of Higher Education] (in French) – via Gallica.
- Adam, Antoine (1997). Histoire de la littérature française au XVIIe siècle [History of 17th Century French Literature] (in French). Vol. II. Albin Michel. ISBN 978-2-226-19886-0.
- Barrier, Thibault (2022). "L'admiration, antichambre des passions dans La Princesse de Clèves" [Admiration, an antechamber of passions in 'The Princess of Cleves']. Dix-septième siècle (in French). 294 (1): 51–68. doi:10.3917/dss.221.0051. ISSN 0012-4273.
- Baschet, Armand (1875). Histoire du dépot des archives des affaires étrangères, 1710-1796 [History of the Foreign Affairs Archives, 1710–1796] (in French). Plon.
- Bibliothèque du Patrimoine de Clermont Auvergne Métropole (n.d.). "Charlotte de Roannez" (in French).
- Bibliothèque nationale de France (1643). "Table Pascaline: Bibliothèque nationale de France, département des Manuscrits" [Pascaline Table: National Library of France, Department of Manuscripts]. expositions.bnf.fr.
- Boudhors, Charles-Henri (1933). "Observations et recherches sur le "Discours des passions de l'amour" attribué à Pascal". Gallica.
- Boutroux, Émile (1939). Pascal.
- Brunet, George (1959). Un prétendu traité de Pascal: Le Discours sur les passions de l'amour. Paris: Les Éditions de Minuit.
- Brunetière, Ferdinand (1885). "Revue littéraire - De quelques Travaux sur Pascal". Revue des Deux Mondes: 194–212.
- Brunschvicg, Léon (1909). Pensées et opuscules (5e édition revue) / Blaise Pascal; publiés avec une introduction, des notices, des notes et deux fac-similés du manuscrit des Pensées, par M. Léon Brunschvicg,... (5 ed.). Paris: Hachette.
- Busnelli, Manlio Duilio (1934). "Encore quelques preuves que le "Discours sur les passions de l'amour" n'est pas de Pascal". Gallica.
- Comte-Sponville, André (1997). "L'amour selon Pascal". Revue Internationale de Philosophie: 131–160.
- Cousin, Victor (1843). "Discours sur les passions de l'amour, fragment inédit de Pascal". Période initiale: 991–1007.
- Cousin, Victor (1876). Études sur Pascal (in French). Didier.
- Cuénin, Micheline (1985). "La femme à travers le Discours des Passions de l'amour". Littératures classiques. 7: 13–21. doi:10.3406/licla.1985.1046.
- Descotes, Dominique (n.d.). "Le Recueil des papiers originaux des Pensées (RO)". www.penseesdepascal.fr.
- Deyras, Maurice (1959). "Sœur Charlotte de la Passion: Mademoiselle de Roannez, Duchesse de la Feuillade". Gallica.
- Faguet, Émile (1904). "Pascal amoureux". Gallica.
- Faguet, Émile (1907). Amours d'hommes de lettres: Pascal, Corneille, Voltaire, Mirabeau, Chateaubriand, Lamartine, Guizot, Mérimée, Sainte-Beuve, George Sand et Musset / Émile Faguet. La Revue latine.
- Faguet, Émile (1911). Discours sur les passions de l'amour: attribué à Pascal, avec un commentaire de Emile Faguet. Grasset.
- Faugère, Armand-Prosper (1845). Lettres, opuscules et mémoires de madame Périer et de Jacqueline, sœurs de Pascal, et de Marguerite Périer, sa nièce / publ. sur les manuscrits originaux par M. P. Faugère.
- Faugère, Armand-Prosper (1844). Pensées fragments et lettres, publ. par P. Faugère (in French).
- Flottes, Abbé (1845). "Études sur Pascal" Revue du Midi (in French). Chez Gras.
- Fléchier, Esprit (1856). Mémoires de Fléchier sur les grands jours d'Auvergne, en 1665 / annotés et augmentés d'un appendice par M. Chéruel; précédés d'une notice par M. Sainte-Beuve,... Hachette.
- La Fontaine, Jean de (1671). "Recueil de poésies chrétiennes et diverses". gallica.bnf.fr.
- Fuzet, Frédéric (1876). Les jansénistes du XVIIe siècle : Leur histoire et leur dernier historien, M. Sainte-Beuve (in French).
- Gaxie, Jean-Pierre (2008). Discours sur les passions de l'amour, coll. "La chose à penser". Nantes: Cécile Defaut.
- Gazier, Augustin (1877), Le roman de Pascal (in French)
- Giraud, Victor (1907). "Pascal a-t-il été amoureux? À propos d'un nouveau manuscrit du Discours sur les passions de l'amour". Gallica.
- Giraud, Victor (1920). "Pascal et le " Discours sur les passions de l'amour, "". Revue des Deux Mondes: 599–607.
- Giraud, Victor (1951). "Comptes-rendus: L'auteur présumé du Discours sur les passions de l'amour, Charles-Paul d'Escoubleau, marquis d'Alluye et de Sourdis". Revue d'Histoire littéraire de la France. 51 (4): 489–491. ISSN 0035-2411. JSTOR 40520927.
- Havet, Ernest (1852). Pensées de Pascal publiées dans leur texte authentique avec un commentaire suivi et une étude littéraire par Ernest Havet... (in French). Dezobry et E. Magdeleine.
- Havet, Ernest (1866). Pensées de Pascal: publiées dans leur texte authentique avec une introduction, des notes et des remarques, par Ernest Havet. Paris: C. Delagrave.
- Henriot, Émile (1933). "Courrier littéraire, XVIIe siècle". La Nouvelle revue critique.
- Jacoubet, Henri (1938). "Le Discours des Passions de l'Amour peut-il être rendu à Pascal?". Gallica.
- Josset, Sylvain (2021). "Une "logique du cœur "? Max Scheler lecteur de Pascal". Dix-septième siècle (in French). 290 (1): 9–26. doi:10.3917/dss.211.0009. ISSN 0012-4273.
- Jovy, Ernest (1908). Pascal inédit, t. II : Les derniers véritables sentiments de Pascal.
- Labitte, Charles (1846). "Études littéraires". Gallica.
- Lafuma, Louis (1949). "Le Discours sur les passions de l'amour n'est pas de Pascal". Gallica.
- Lafuma, Louis (1950). Discours sur les passions de l'amour. Paris: Delmas.
- Lafuma, Louis (1962). "Le véritable Auteur des " Questions d'amour " des portefeuilles Vallant". Revue d'Histoire Littéraire de la France.
- de Lescure, Adolphe (1881). Pascal et Mlle de Roannez (in French). Le Correspondant.
- Malebranche, Nicolas; Simon, Jules (1842). "De la recherche de la vérité". Charpentier.
- Mesnard, Jean (1965). Pascal et les Roannez (1 ed.). Paris: Desclée de Brouwer.
- Mesnard, Jean, ed. (1992). Pascal. Œuvres complètes. Vol. 4. Paris: Hachette & cie.
- Mesnard, Jean (2011). "Histoire secrète de la recherche pascalienne au XXe siècle", dans North American Society for Seventeenth-Century French Literature, Actes du 33e congrès annuel de la North American Society for Seventeenth-Century French Literature (in French). Tempe, Arizona State University. ISBN 978-3-8233-5555-7.
- Michaut, Gustave (1942). Pascal, Molière, Musset: essais de critique et de psychologie (in French). Éditions Alsatia.
- Moreau, Pierre-François (2015). Les passions à l'âge classique. Tome II: Théories et critiques des passions (in French). Humensis. ISBN 978-2-13-073900-5.
- Mortier, Roland (1962). "Brunet (Georges). Un prétendu traité de Pascal. Le Discours sur les passions de l'amour". Revue belge de Philologie et d'Histoire. 40 (2): 461–463.
- Molinier, Auguste (1879). "Les pensées de Blaise Pascal: Texte revu sur le manuscrit autographe avec une préface et des notes par Auguste Molinier". gallica.bnf.fr.
- Moriarty, Michael (2006). Fallen Nature, Fallen Selves: Early Modern French Thought II. Oxford University Press. ISBN 978-0-19-171059-9.
- Peyre, Henri (1930). "Pascal et la critique contemporaine". Gallica.
- Plazenet, Laurence; Ferreyrolles, Gérard; Cagnat-Debœuf, Constance; Josse-Volongo, Anne-Claire; Pouge-Bellais, Françoise; Thirouin, Laurent; Gheeraert, Tony (2022). "Sexe, mensonges et Blaise Pascal : réponse à un article paru dans Ouest-France" (in French).
- Prévost-Paradol, Lucien Anatole (1865). Études sur les moralistes français: suivies de quelques réflexions sur divers sujets (in French). Hachette.
- Ravaisson, Félix (1887). "Revue des deux mondes : recueil de la politique, de l'administration et des moeurs". Gallica.
- Sainte-Beuve, Charles Augustin (1848). Port-Royal (in French). E. Renduel.
- Souriau, Maurice (1935). Les pensées catholiques de Blaise Pascal. Paris: Spès.
- Strowski, Fortunat (1920). "L'énigme de Pascal et du "Discours sur les passions de l'amour"". Gallica.
- Sully-Prudhomme, René François Armand (1890). "Examens du discours sur les passions de l'amour". Revue des Deux Mondes: 318–336.
- Surcouf, Françoise (2022). "Un château, une histoire d'amour. La mélancolique aventure de Blaise Pascal avec une aristocrate". Ouest-France.fr (in French).
- la Suze, Henriette de Coligny de la Suze; Pelisson-Fontanier, Paul (1664). "Recueil de pièces galantes en prose et en vers". gallica.bnf.fr.
- Tournemire, Pierfit-Guillaume (n.d.). "Anne-Françoise de Loménie".
- Tourneur, Zacharie (1943). Une vie avec Blaise Pascal. Paris: J. Vrin.
- Truc, Gonzague (1949). Pascal: son temps et le nôtre.
- Vinet, Alexandre (1876). Etudes sur Blaise Pascal (3 ed.). Paris, Sandoz et Fischbacher.
