= Pommer (surname) =

Pommer is a German surname meaning Pomeranian. Notable people with the surname include:

- Albert Pommer (1886–1946), German film producer
- Erich Pommer (1889–1966), German-born film producer and executive
- Jānis Pommers, first Latvian Archbishop of the Latvian Orthodox Church
- Markus Pommer (born 1991), German racing driver
- Merle C. Pommer (1910–1993), American politician
- Reinhold Pommer (1935–2014), road and track cyclist from Germany
- William Albert Pommer (1895–1971), Liberal party member of the Canadian House of Commons
- William Henry Pommer (1851–1937), American composer

== See also ==
- Pommer, an early musical reed instrument
- Pommier (surname), a French surname
