= Pommier (surname) =

Pommier is a French surname. Notable people with the surname include:

- Adrien Pommier (1919–1973), French Resistance member during World War II
- Albert Pommier (1880–1943), French sculptor
- Gérard Pommier (1941–2023), French psychiatrist and psychoanalyst
- Jean Pommier (1893–1973), French literary scholar
- Jean-Bernard Pommier (1944–2026), French pianist and conductor

== See also ==
- Jacques Antoine Rabaut-Pommier (1744–1820), a politician of the French revolutionary era
- Pommer (surname), a German surname
