= Louise-Victorine Ackermann =

French poet (1813–1890)

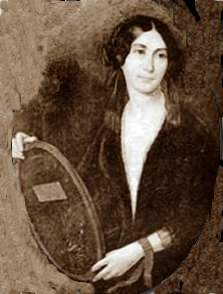
Louise-Victorine Ackermann

Louise-Victorine Ackermann (née Choquet) (30 November 1813 – 2 August 1890) was a French Parnassian poet.

== Life ==
Ackermann was born in Paris, but spent her younger days in more rural surroundings near Montdidier, south-east of Amiens. In 1829, her father, having undertaken her early education, in the philosophy of the Encyclopaedists, sent her to school in Paris.

In 1838, Victorine Choquet went to Berlin to study German. She also learned Sanskrit and Chinese.

In Berlin, she met and married Paul Ackermann, an Alsatian philologist, in 1843. After little more than two years of happy married life her husband died, and Madame Ackermann went to live in Nice with a favorite sister. In 1855, she published Contes en vers, and in 1862, Contes et poésies.

Very different from these simple and charming contes is the work on which Madame Ackermann's real reputation rests. She published in 1874 Poésies, premières poésies, poésies philosophiques, a volume of verses expressing her revolt against human suffering. The volume was reviewed in the Revue des deux mondes for May 1871 by Elme Marie Caro; though he deprecated the impiété désespérée of the verses, he praised their vigour and the excellence of their form.

Soon after the publication of this volume Madame Ackermann moved back to Paris, where she gathered round her a circle of friends, but published nothing further except a prose volume, the Pensées d'un solitaire ("Thoughts of a Recluse", 1883), to which she prefixed a short autobiography. She died at Nice on 2 August 1890.

== Published works ==
Louise Ackermann's published works as cited by An Encyclopedia of Continental Women Writers.

- Contes et Poésies, 1862.
- Le Déluge, 1876.
- Pensées d'une Solitaire, Precédées d'une Autobiographie, 1882.
- Oeuvres, 1885.
- Ma Vie, 1885.
- Premières Poésies, 1885.
- Poésies Philosophiques, 1885.
- Contes, 1955.
- Poésies Philosophiques, 1971.
