= Merle C. Pommer =

American politician (1910–1993)

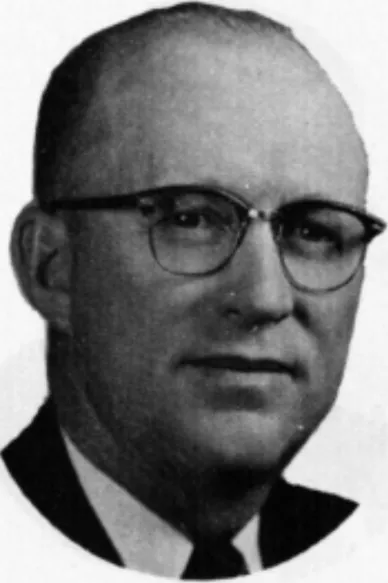
- Pommer in 1971

Member of the South Dakota House of Representatives
- In office 1955–1974

Personal details
- Born: December 19, 1910 Castlewood, South Dakota, U.S.
- Died: October 11, 1993 (aged 82)
- Party: Republican

Merle C. Pommer (December 19, 1910 – October 11, 1993) was an American politician. He served as a Republican member of the South Dakota House of Representatives.

== Life and career ==
Pommer was born in Castlewood, South Dakota. He was a farmer and cattle feeder.

Pommer served in the South Dakota House of Representatives from 1955 to 1974.

Pommer died on October 11, 1993, at the age of 82.
