= Jean Pommier =

French literary scholar and professor (1893–1973)

Jean Joseph Marie Vincent Pommier (1893–1973) was a French literary scholar. He held a chair at the Collège de France from 1946 to 1964, where he succeeded Paul Valéry.

Pommier was a member of the Académie des sciences morales et politiques, of the Académie royale de langue et de littérature françaises de Belgique. He was elected a foreign member of the Royal Netherlands Academy of Arts and Sciences in 1957. He was a corresponding fellow of the British Academy.

== Selected publications ==
- Renan d'après des documents inédits, 1923, Prix Marcelin Guérin of the Académie française in 1924
- La Revue des cours et conférences, bibliographical essay on Renan (1923)
- La pensée religieuse de Renan, 1925
- La mystique de Baudelaire, 1932
- La Jeunesse cléricale d'Ernest Renan – Saint-Sulpice, 1933.
- Proust, 1939
- Diderot avant Vincennes, 1939
- Variétés sur Alfred de Musset et son théâtre, 1944
- Questions de critique et d'histoire littéraire, 1945
- Paul Valéry et la création littéraire, 1946
- L'École d'administration et le Collège de France en 1848, 1948
- Aspects de Racine. L'histoire littéraire d'un couple tragique, Paris, Nizet, 1954
- Créations en littérature, 1955
- Le Cimetière marin de Paul Valéry, 1961
- L'univers poétique et musical d'Ernest Renan, 1966
- Le spectacle intérieur, 1973
- Cinq cahiers rénaniens, 1972

== Sources ==
- https://ir.vanderbilt.edu/bitstream/handle/1803/4235/BB%208-2.pdf?sequence=1&isAllowed=y
- https://archibibscdf.hypotheses.org/3230
- https://www.persee.fr/authority/63878
- https://www.jstor.org/stable/40525257
- https://link.springer.com/chapter/10.1007/978-94-010-1377-2_4
