= List of University of Paris people =

This is an incomplete list of notable people affiliated with the University of Paris, often called "La Sorbonne".

== Faculty professors ==
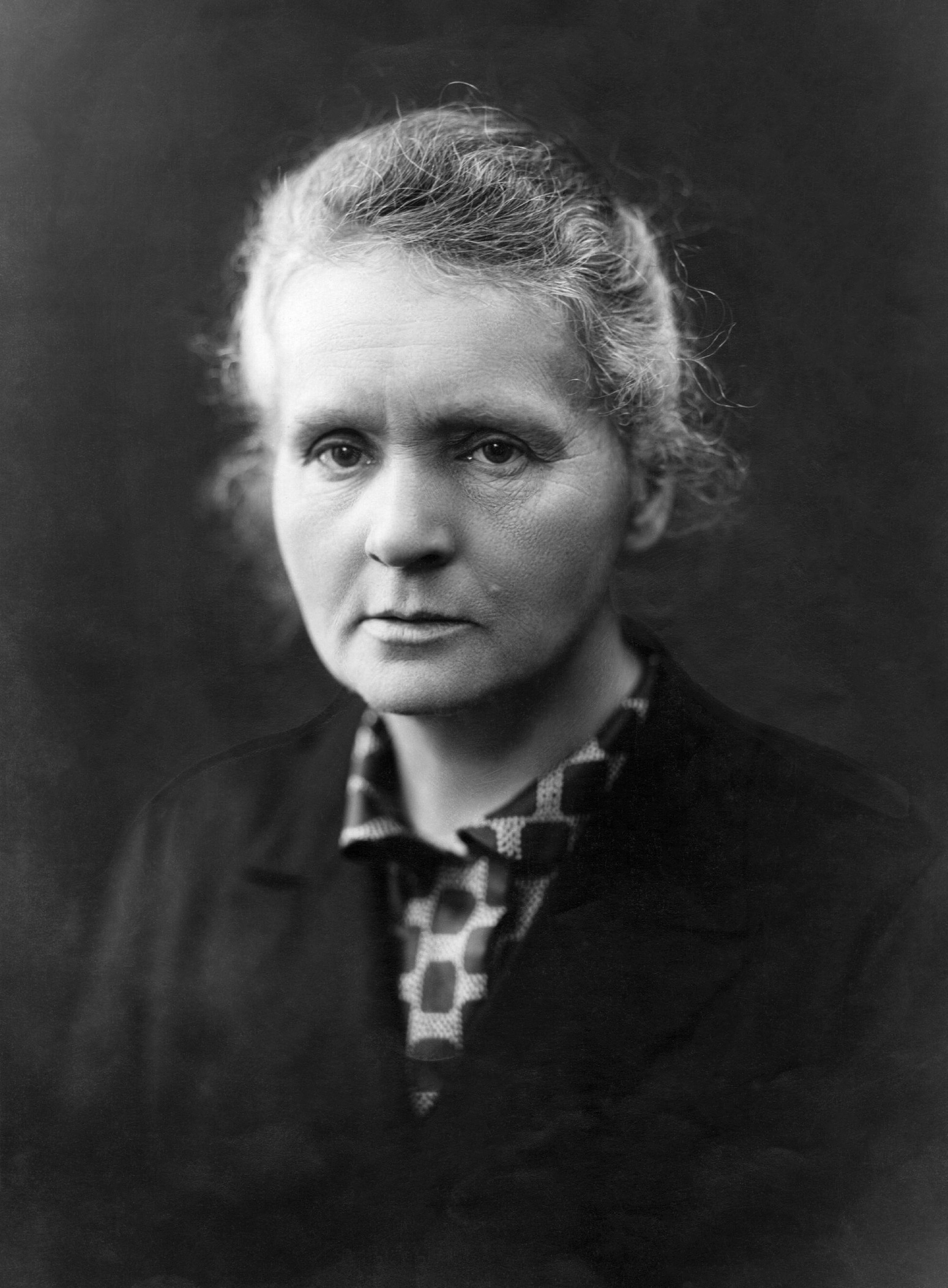
Marie Curie

- Jean-Jacques Ampère (1800–1864), French philologist
- St. Thomas Aquinas (1225–1274), Doctor of the Church, Italian Catholic philosopher and theologian in the scholastic tradition
- François Victor Alphonse Aulard (1849–1928), French historian of the Revolution and Napoleon
- Edvard Beneš (1884 - 1948) President and co-founder of Czechoslovakia
- François-Joseph Bérardier de Bataut (1720–1794), French teacher, writer and translator
- Boetius of Dacia, 13th-century Swedish philosopher
- St. Bonaventure (1221–1274), a Franciscan theologian and Doctor of the Church
- George Buchanan (1506–1582), Scottish historian
- Victor Cousin (1792–1867), French philosopher
- Marie Curie (1867–1934), Polish-French chemist, pioneer in the early field of radiology and the first two-time Nobel laureate
- Jean Philibert Damiron (1794–1862), French philosopher
- Jacques Derrida (1930–2004), Algerian-born French literary critic and philosopher of Jewish descent
- Claude Charles Fauriel (1772–1844), French historian, philologist and critic
- St. Edmund of Abingdon (c. 1174–1240), English Saint and Archbishop of Canterbury
- François Géré (1950-), research director, specializing in geostrategic issues
- Nicolas Eugène Géruzez (1799–1865), French critic
- Étienne Gilson (1884–1978), French philosopher and historian of philosophy
- François Guizot (1787–1874), French historian, orator and statesman
- Jacques Hadamard (1865-1963), French mathematician
- Paul Janet (1823–1899), French philosopher and writer
- Frédéric Joliot (1900–1958), French physicist and Nobel laureate
- Irène Joliot-Curie (1897–1956), Nobel Prize–winning French scientist; daughter of Marie Curie and Pierre Curie
- Robert Kilwardby (c. 1215–1279), English Cardinal and Archbishop of Canterbury
- Stephen Langton (c. 1150–1228), English Cardinal and Archbishop of Canterbury
- Albertus Magnus (between 1193 and 1206–1280), Doctor of the Church, Dominican friar, German philosopher and theologian
- Pierre Martin Ngô Đình Thục (1897–1984), Roman Catholic Archbishop of Huế, Vietnam
- Frédéric Ozanam (1813–1853), French-Catholic scholar
- John Peckham (c. 1230–1292), English Archbishop of Canterbury
- Henri Poincaré (1854–1912), mathematician, theoretical physicist, philosopher of science
- Pierre Paul Royer-Collard (1763–1845), French statesman and philosopher, leader of the Doctrinaires group
- Émile Saisset (1814–1863), French philosopher
- Étienne Vacherot (1809–1897), French philosophical writer
- Abel-François Villemain (1790–1870), French politician and writer
- Robert Winchelsey (c. 1245–1313), English Cardinal and Archbishop of Canterbury

== Notable alumni ==
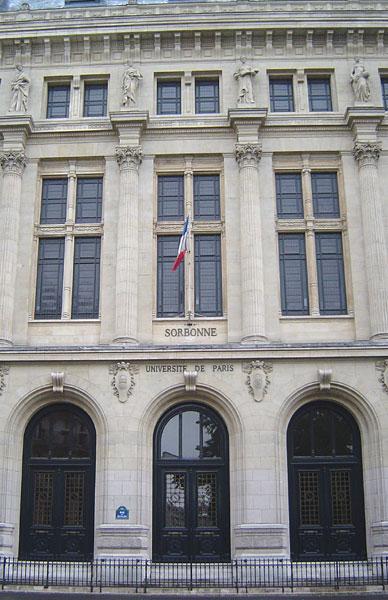
Entrance to the Sorbonne

- Michel Aflaq (1910–1989), ideological founder of Ba'athism, a form of Arab nationalism
- Milos Alcalay (born 1945), Venezuelan diplomat
- Alexander Alekhine (1892–1946), World Chess Champion
- Pope Alexander V (1339–1410), Pope or antipope during the Western Schism
- Nathan Alterman (1910–70), Israeli poet and playwright
- Luis López Álvarez (born 1930), Spanish poet
- Mirza Javad Khan Ameri (1891–1980), Iranian politician
- Reginald Fraser Amonoo (born 1932), ghanaian academic
- Theo Angelopoulos (born 1936), Greek film director
- St. Thomas Aquinas (1225–1274), Italian Catholic philosopher and theologian in the scholastic tradition
- Antoine Arnauld (1612–1694), Roman Catholic theologian and writer
- Robert Badinter, Professor of Law
- Joaquín Balaguer (1906–2002), President of the Dominican Republic
- Honoré de Balzac (1799–1850), writer
- Roland Barthes (1915–1980, literary critic, literary and social theorist, philosopher and semiotician
- Jean Baudrillard (1929–2007), Cultural theorist and philosopher
- Simone de Beauvoir (1908–1986), author, philosopher, and feminist
- Eliezer Ben-Yehuda (1858–1922), Litvak lexicographer of Hebrew and newspaper editor
- Pope Benedict XVI (1927-2022), born Joseph Alois Ratzinger
- Sergei Natanovich Bernstein (1880-1968), Russian and Soviet mathematician
- Ernst Boepple (1887–1950), German Nazi official and SS officer executed for war crimes
- Nicolas Boileau-Despréaux (1636–1711), poet and critic
- Habib Bourguiba (c. 1903–2000), first President of Tunisia (1957–1987)
- Paschase Broët French Jesuit and early companion of Ignatius of Loyola
- George Buchanan (1506–1582), Scottish historian
- Gerald M. Moser (1915–2005), German-American academic and author
- John Calvin (1509–1564), Protestant Reformer and proponent of Calvinism
- Roch Carrier (born 1937), Canadian novelist
- Pierre Cartier (1932–2024), mathematician
- Constantin-François Chassebœuf, philosopher and count
- Adrienne Clarkson (born 1939), Governor General of Canada
- Conrad of Megenberg (born 1309), German historian
- Marie Skłodowska-Curie (1867–1934), physicist, Nobel Prize in Physics in 1903 with her husband Pierre Curie, Nobel Prize in Chemistry in 1911
- Pierre Curie (1859–1906), physicist, Nobel Prize in Physics in 1903 with his wife Marie Skłodowska-Curie
- Gilles Deleuze (1925–1995), philosopher
- Hasan Dosti (1895–1991), Albanian jurist and politician
- St. Maurice Duault (1117–1191), French abbot and saint
- Raymond Duchamp-Villon (1876–1918), sculptor
- St. Edmund of Abingdon (c. 1174–1240), English Saint and Archbishop of Canterbury
- Desiderius Erasmus (1466/1469–1536), Dutch humanist and theologian
- Peter Faber (1506–1546), Christian missionary and co-founder of the Society of Jesus
- Moshé Feldenkrais (1904–1984), founder of the Feldenkrais Method of movement education
- Lawrence Ferlinghetti (born 1919), poet and co-owner of the City Lights Bookstore and publishing house
- David Feuerwerker (1912–1980), rabbi and historian
- Jean-Luc Godard (born 1930), film director
- Haim Gouri (born 1923), Israeli poet, novelist, journalist, and documentary filmmaker
- Abimael Guzmán (born 1934), leader of the Maoist guerrilla movement Sendero Luminoso in Peru
- Francis Seymour Haden (1818–1910), English surgeon, best known as an etcher
- Pavel Hak (born 1962), playwright and author
- Jean-Noël Herlin (born 1940), Archivist and curator of art and books
- Mahmoud Hessaby (1903–1992), Iranian scientist and politician
- Ivica Hiršl (1905–1941), Croatian communist and Mayor of Koprivnica
- Enver Hoxha (1908–1985), Albanian communist dictator (1946–1985)
- Victor Hugo (1802–1885), Romantic novelist, playwright, essayist and statesman
- St. Ignatius of Loyola (1491–1556), founder of the Society of Jesus
- Luce Irigaray (born 1930), French feminist, psychoanalytic and cultural theorist
- Irène Joliot-Curie (1897–1956), scientist, shared the Nobel Prize in Chemistry 1935 with her husband Frédéric Joliot
- Max Karoubi (born 1938), mathematician
- Vilayat Inayat Khan (born 1916), Sufic leader and writer
- Robert Kilwardby (c. 1215–1279), English Cardinal and Archbishop of Canterbury
- Dimitri Kitsikis (born 1935), Fellow, Royal Society of Canada
- Jean-Louis Koszul (1921-2018), mathematician
- Arvid Kurck (1464–1522), Finnish bishop
- Stephen Langton (c. 1150–1228), English Cardinal and Archbishop of Canterbury
- Ronald Lauder (born 1944), American businessman, art collector, philanthropist, and political activist
- Antoine-Laurent Lavoisier (1743–1794), father of modern chemistry, developed the law of conservation of mass
- Theodore K. Lawless (1892-1971), American dermatologist, medical researcher, and philanthropist
- Diego Laynez (1512–1565), Roman Catholic theologian, and the second general of the Society of Jesus
- Henri Lefebvre (1901–1991), Marxist sociologist and philosopher
- Bernard Lewis (born 1916), British American historian specializing in oriental studies
- Claude Lévi-Strauss (1908–2009), anthropologist who developed structuralism
- Mélanie Lipinska (1900s), Historian of Female Scientists
- Peter Lombard (c. 1100–1160/64), Roman Catholic theologian
- Jean-François Lyotard (1924–1998), philosopher and literary theorist
- Hilda Madsen (1910–1981), British-American artist and dog breeder
- Norman Mailer (1923–2007), American writer
- John Mair (also known as John Major) (1467–1550), Scottish philosopher
- Benoît Mandelbrot (1923-2010), mathematician
- Sigmund Mannheimer (1835–1909), German-American educator
- Fabrizio Marrella (born 1966), Italian scholar; Full Professor of International Law & International Business Law; former European Director of the Master in Human Rights
- Marsilius of Padua (1270–1342), Italian scholar; Rector of the university 1313
- Bernard Miège (born 1941), media theorist
- Sherman Minton, Democratic United States Senator from Indiana; Associate Justice of the Supreme Court of the United States
- François Mitterrand, former President of France
- André Morellet (1727–1819), economist and writer
- Jacqueline Kennedy Onassis (1929-1994), wife of US President John F. Kennedy and Greek shipping magnate Aristotle Onassis; US First Lady 1961-1963
- Mikhail Vasilievich Ostrogradsky (1801–1862), Ukrainian mathematician, mechanician and physicist
- John Peckham (c. 1230–1292), English Archbishop of Canterbury
- José Francisco Peña Gómez (1937–1998), leader of the Dominican Revolutionary Party
- Marguerite Catherine Perey (1909-1975), discovered Francium and was the first woman member of the French Academy of Sciences
- Denis Pétau (1583–1652), Jesuit theologian
- Konstanin "Koča" Popović (1908-1992), Spanish Civil War volunteer, Yugoslav Partisans division commander and Yugoslav statesman
- Peter of Blois (1135–1203), poet and diplomat
- Paul H. Raihle (born 1893), member of the Wisconsin State Assembly
- Pauline Réage (1907–1998), author
- Paul Ricœur (1913–2005), philosopher
- Vera Maria Rosenberg (Vera Atkins of SOE)
- Ibrahim Rugova (1944–2006), first President of Kosovo
- Modjtaba Sadria (1949-), philosopher, Honorary Professor of Centre for Ethics in Medicine and Society in Monash University, Australia
- Émile Saisset (1814–1863), philosopher
- Nawaf Salam, Ambassador and Permanent Representative of Lebanon to the United Nations
- Alfonso Salmeron (1511–1590), theologian, and one of the original members of the Society of Jesus
- Menachem Mendel Schneerson, the seventh Lubavitch Rebbe of the Chabad Hasidei Dynasty and World Jewish Outreach Organization
- Jean-Pierre Serre (born 1926), mathematician
- Ali Shariati (1933–1977), Iranian sociologist
- Emmanuel Joseph Sieyès (1748–1836), French statesman; revolutionary leader; instigator of the coup d'état of 18 Brumaire, which brought Napoleon Bonaparte to power
- Joshua Sobol (born 1939), Israeli playwright, writer, and director
- Susan Sontag (1933–2004), American writer and activist
- Jean Stein, American author and editor
- Hasan Tahsini (1811-1881), Albanian scholar
- Andrea Tantaros, (born 1978), American political commentator
- Pierre Teilhard de Chardin (1881–1955), Jesuit Priest, paleontologist and philosopher
- René Thom (1923-2002), mathematician
- Dale C. Thomson DFC (1923–1999), Canadian academic, author, Prime Ministerial advisor
- Marina Tsvetaeva (1892–1941), Russian poet and writer
- Seka Severin de Tudja (1923–2007), Yugoslavian-born Venezuelan ceramist
- Anne-Robert-Jacques Turgot, Baron de Laune (1727–1781), French statesman and economist
- John Turner (born 1929), former Canadian Prime Minister
- Maria Ubach i Font (born 1973), current Minister of Foreign Affairs of Andorra
- Simone Veil (1927-2017), lawyer and politician, Minister of Health, President of the European Parliament, and member of the Constitutional Council of France
- Jacques Vergès (born 1925), lawyer
- Andreas Vesalius (1514–1564), Belgian physician and anatomist
- Sérgio Vieira de Mello (1948–2003), Brazilian United Nations diplomat
- Paul Virilio (born 1932), cultural theorist and urbanist
- Walter of Châtillon, 12th-century writer and theologian
- Sam Waterston (born 1940), American actor
- André Weil (1906-1998), mathematician
- Ruth Westheimer (born Karola Siegel, 1928; known as "Dr. Ruth"), German-American sex therapist, talk show host, author, professor, Holocaust survivor, and former Haganah sniper.
- Elie Wiesel (1928–2016), Romanian-born American Holocaust survivor, Nobel Laureate. novelist and political activist
- Robert Winchelsey (c. 1245–1313), English Cardinal and Archbishop of Canterbury
- St. Francis Xavier (1506–1552), Christian missionary and co-founder of the Society of Jesus
- Nasser Yeganeh, PhD in public law, former President of the Supreme Court of Iran

=== Non-Graduates ===
- Guy Debord (1931–1994), Situationist theorist
