= Miège (disambiguation) =

Miège is a municipality in the district of Sierre in the canton of Valais in Switzerland.

Miège or Miege may also refer to:

== People ==
- Guy Miege (1644 – after 1718), English author and lexicographer who plagiarised a work by Edward Chamberlayne
- John Baptist Miège (1815–1884), American Jesuit prelate and missionary
- Bernard Miège (b. 1941), French media theorist

== Other ==
- Bishop Miege High School, American Catholic high school

== See also ==
- Mièges, a commune in eastern France
