= Molpré =

- Part of Mièges
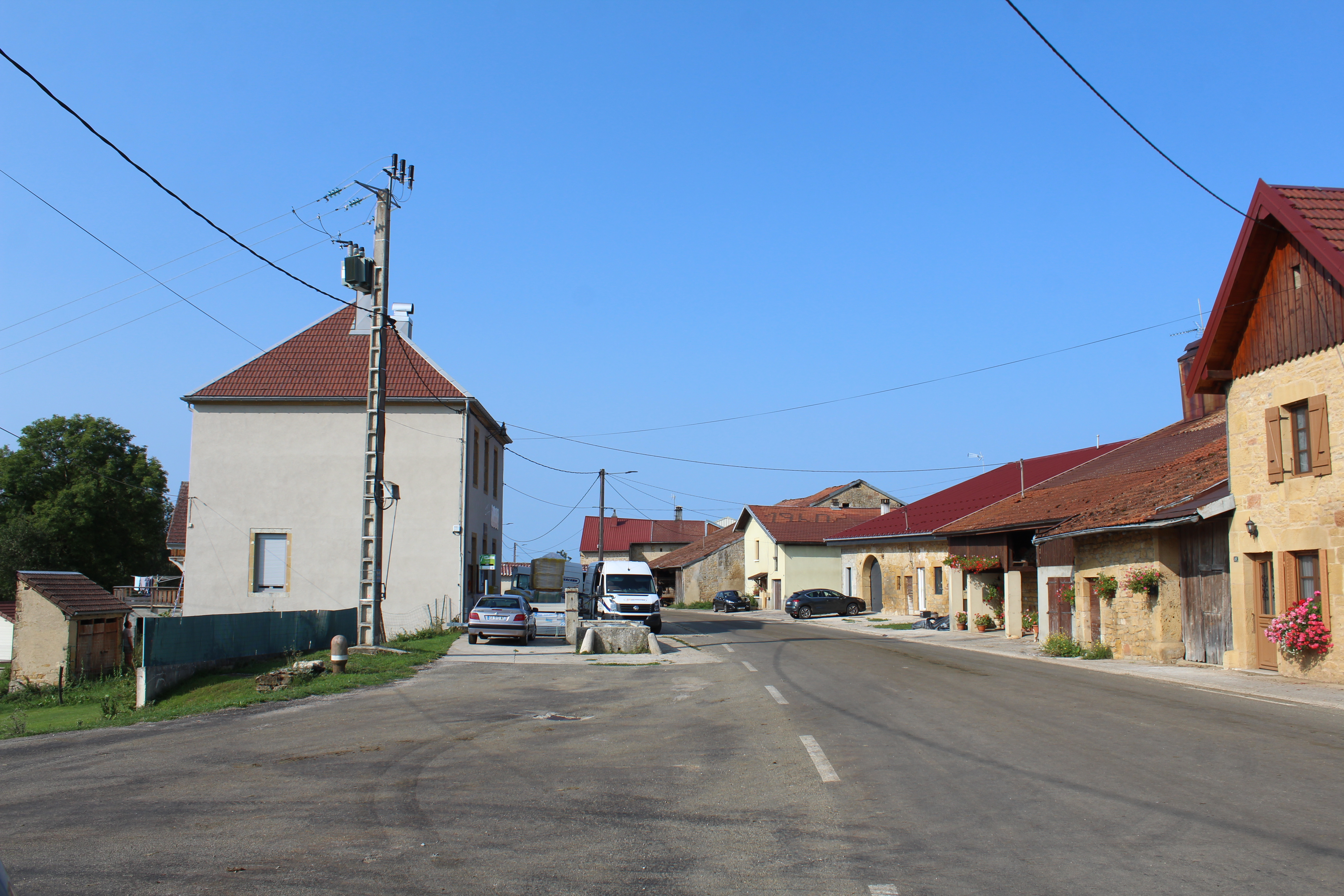
- Street in Molpré- the town hall is the building to the left

- Coat of arms
- Location of Molpré
- Location within France Location within Bourgogne-Franche-Comté
- Coordinates: 46°47′18″N 6°04′06″E
- Country: France
- Region: Bourgogne-Franche-Comté
- Department: Jura
- Arrondissement: Lons-le-Saunier
- Canton: Saint-Laurent-en-Grandvaux
- Commune: Mièges
- Area^{1}: 2.73 km^{2} (1.05 sq mi)
- Highest elevation: 879 m (2,884 ft)
- Lowest elevation: 739 m (2,425 ft)
- Population (2022): 27
  - Density: 9.9/km^{2} (26/sq mi)
- Time zone: UTC+01:00 (CET)
  - Summer (DST): UTC+02:00 (CEST)
- Postal code: 39250
- ^{1} French Land Register data, which excludes lakes, ponds, glaciers > 1 km^{2} (0.386 sq mi or 247 acres) and river estuaries.

Molpré (French pronunciation: [mɔlpʁe]) is a former commune in the Jura department in Bourgogne-Franche-Comté in eastern France. On 1 January 2016, it was merged into the commune of Mièges.

== See also ==
- Communes of the Jura department
