= Esserval-Combe =

- Part of Mièges
- Location of Esserval-Combe
- Location within France Location within Bourgogne-Franche-Comté
- Coordinates: 46°48′06″N 6°02′27″E
- Country: France
- Region: Bourgogne-Franche-Comté
- Department: Jura
- Arrondissement: Lons-le-Saunier
- Canton: Saint-Laurent-en-Grandvaux
- Commune: Mièges
- Area^{1}: 1.76 km^{2} (0.68 sq mi)
- Highest elevation: 846 m (2,776 ft)
- Lowest elevation: 730 m (2,400 ft)
- Population (2023): 23
  - Density: 13/km^{2} (34/sq mi)
- Time zone: UTC+01:00 (CET)
  - Summer (DST): UTC+02:00 (CEST)
- Postal code: 39250
- ^{1} French Land Register data, which excludes lakes, ponds, glaciers > 1 km^{2} (0.386 sq mi or 247 acres) and river estuaries.

Esserval-Combe (French pronunciation: [ɛsɛʁval kɔ̃b]) is a former commune in the Jura department in Bourgogne-Franche-Comté in eastern France. On 1 January 2016, it was merged into the commune of Mièges.

== See also ==
- Communes of the Jura department
