= Stendhal University =

French university (1970–2015)

- Université Stendhal
- Type: Public
- Active: 1970–2015
- President: Lise Dumasy
- Location: Grenoble, France; 45°11′28″N 5°46′26″E
- Campus: Saint Martin d'Hères
- Website: http://www.u-grenoble3.fr/

Stendhal University (French: Université Stendhal, also known as Grenoble III) was a university located in the outskirts of Grenoble, France that offered courses in foreign languages and cultures, ancient and modern literature, language and communication sciences. Having traditionally focused on training educators, it has more recently become known for preparing students for careers in journalism, communication and culture.

Each year, the CUEF (University Center for French Studies) educated over 3,000 foreign students through various exchange programs in fields covering the entire spectrum of French studies.

The last president was Lise Dumasy.

== History ==
Grenoble III University was founded in 1970, but its origins date back to the Middle Ages and the University of Grenoble. In 1968, Edgar Faure created the Établissement public à caractère scientifique, culturel et professionnel (EPCSCP), endowed with considerable autonomy. Departments were eliminated and replaced by Teaching and Research Units (UER), which later became Training and Research Units (UFR). The founding charter of Grenoble University III, Stendhal, and its three native Grenoble counterparts (Grenoble I, Grenoble II and Grenoble-INP) was signed in 1970.

From its early days, Grenoble III opened itself to new fields and helped create emerging language sciences, as well as Communication and Applied Foreign Languages (LEA). It took multiple steps to diversify fields of study while combining non-specialized fields and those of vocational study:

- New LEA department in 1971
- Diplomas for VD Lawyers and trilingual economists in 1974
- Bachelors and Masters in Information and Communication in 1987
- DESS in Specialized Translation and Production of multilingual texts in 1992
- Creation of the UFR of the Sciences of Communication and Sciences of Language in 1989

In 2016, it merged with two other universities to form the Université Grenoble Alpes, a restoration of the original University of Grenoble.

=== Presidents ===
- Bernard Miège, 1989–1994
- Lise Dumasy, 1999-2004
- Patrick Chézaud, 2004–2008
- Lise Dumasy, 2008–2016
