= Jean-Noël Herlin =

French artist

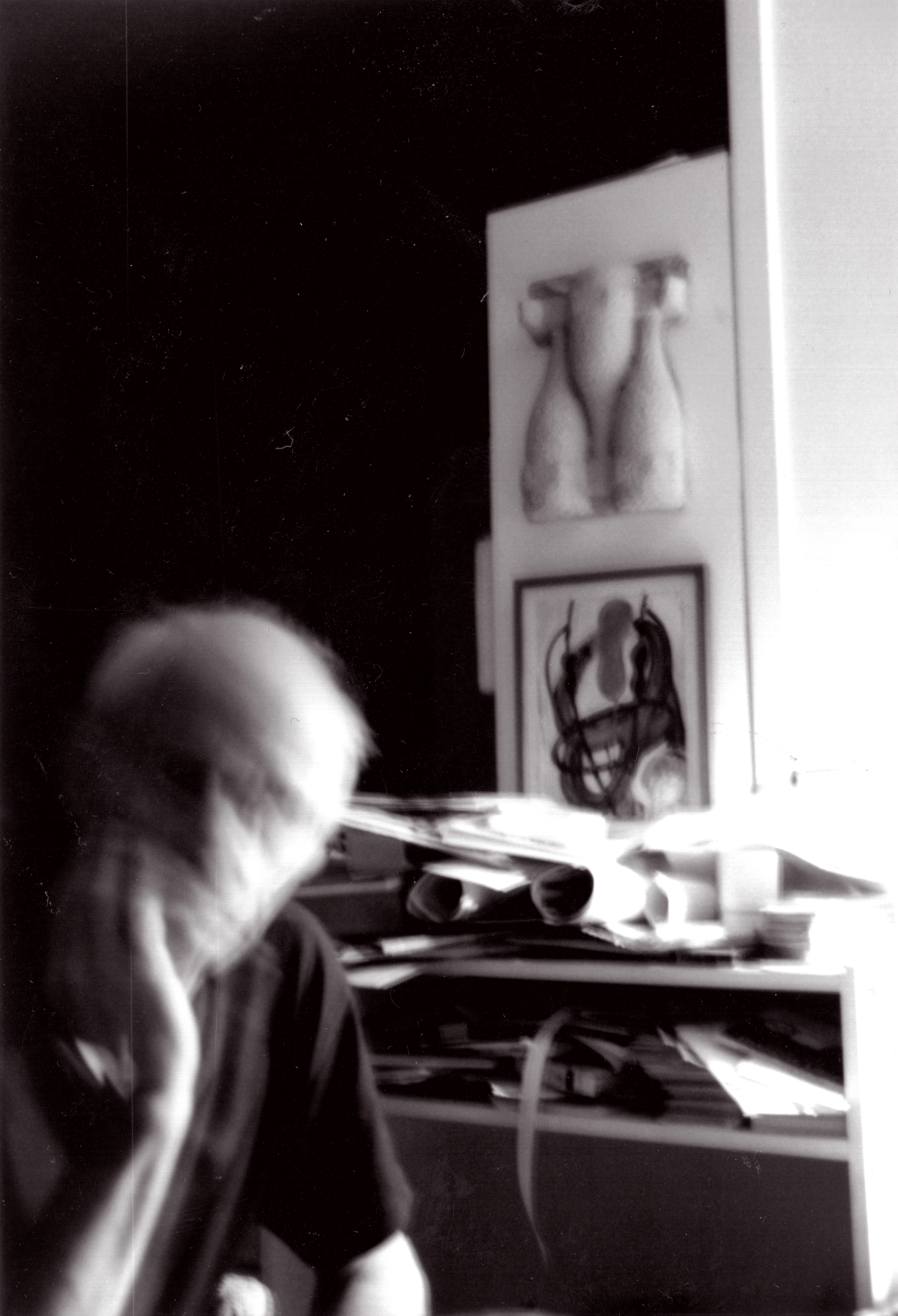
- Herlin in 1995
- Born: December 22, 1940 (age 85); Paris, France
- Known for: Avant Garde and Contemporary Art Publications, and Appraisals
- Website: www.jeannoelherlin.com

Jean-Noël Herlin is an artist, active as a bookseller, archivist, curator, and appraiser born in occupied Paris, France on December 22, 1940.

Between 1972 and 1987, he ran J.N. Herlin, Inc., an antiquarian bookshop in Manhattan, New York, specializing in 20th century art publications. In 1973, he began to work on what became the Jean-Noël Herlin Archive Project. After closing the shop in 1987, he has worked as an appraiser, curator, and writer.

== Education ==
In 1946, Jean-Noël Herlin began school in Paris at the Collège Saint-Jean-de-Passy, Paris, from which he was expelled in 1949. In 1950 at the Cours La Cascade. Herlin attended the Collège (now Lycée Saint-Louis-de-Gonzague) from 1951 to 1959, where his curriculum included Greek and Latin. He was expelled in May 1957, and returned to the school after an re-entrance exam in September of the same year. Herlin spent the fall of 1958 studying philosophy at the Philosophische Fakultät, University of Würzburg, Germany, auditing the lectures of Rudolph Berlinger. In the years 1959-1963 he studied law at the Faculté de Droit, University of Paris, France.

== Biography ==
In February 1941, Herlin was sent with his grandmother, the family cook, and a nanny to Trébeurden, Brittany, France and came back to liberated Paris in the fall/winter of 1944–1945. Herlin spent the spring of 1951 in Bonn, Germany. After several years of Law School at the University of Paris, he moved to New York City in December 1965, where he still resides. The following year, he began working at the Kraus-Thompson Organization Limited in Mamaroneck then Millwood, New York, to become book collection buyer until 1972. In 2014, Herlin won a lifetime achievement award as an archivist, from the Acker Awards for Achievement in the Avant Garde.

== J.N. Herlin Inc. ==
In November 1972, Herlin founded J.N. Herlin, Inc., an antiquarian bookshop specializing in source material in 20th century visual and performing arts.

J.N. Herlin, Inc.'s first location was in Greenwich Village, New York, at 32 Jones Street. It was vacated December 27 of that year, due to a major flood. J.N. Herlin, Inc. relocated to a 108 W. 28th Street, 2nd story loft, where it remained until 1980. In April of that year, he relocated again to a ground floor location at 68 Thompson Street in SoHo.

Having cleared a 15-foot wall in his bookshop, J.N. Herlin, Inc. presented 16 exhibitions of paintings, sculptures and drawings by contemporary artists from 1984 to 1986. The following year, Herlin closed his bookshop to work privately as an appraiser and devote a greater portion of his time to an archive work begun in 1973.

== Jean-Noël Herlin Archive Project ==
The Jean-Noël Herlin Archive Project's purpose is to collect and organize ephemeral, printed primary sources and documentary material in domestic and international intermedia from WWII to the present. The archive is contained in some 500 banker's boxes. Documents are arranged in 4 alphabets. First, by artists and collaborators; second, group events under the event's title; third, in the absence of a title, by venue; forth, periodicals by title. Some of it is kept in his East Harlem apartment, the balance in a Brooklyn storage facility. Both are accessible by appointment.

An exhibition, curated by David Platzker, of Herlin's more than 400-document file on Lawrence Weiner was presented at the Susan Inglett Gallery, New York, in 2011.

== Appraisals ==
Archival appraisals
Jean-Noël Herlin's appraisals have included the archives of Robert Smithson, E.A.T. (Experiments in Art and Technology), Franklin Furnace Archive, David Tudor, the Print Collector's Newsletter, Avalanche, Paul Jenkins and Suzanne Donnelly Jenkins, Berenice Abbott, Walter Pach, Willoughby Sharp, and Christian Wolff.

Herlin has also appraised the Gilbert and Lila Silverman Fluxus Collection, Mark Rothko's "scribble book," publication in the Fick-Eggert Collection at the Art Gallery of Ontario in Toronto, the Trisha Brown Dance Company Archive, and the Paul Rosenberg Archives.

Artwork appraisals
Herlin has also appraised artworks by in the Fick-Eggert Collection (Max Ernst, Heinrich Hoerle, Franz Wilhelm Seiwert); Fluxus artists and contextual artworks in the Gilbert and Lila Silverman Fluxus Collection (Robert Filliou, Toshi Ichiyanagi, Milan Knizak, Arthur Koepcke, Yoko Ono, Naim June Paik, Ben Vautier, Wolf Vostell), Adrian Piper, Walter De Maria, sets and costumes by Robert Rauschenberg, Donald Judd, Nancy Graves, Judith Shea, and others for the Trisha Brown Dance Company, Fred Sandback, Harry Bertoia, and Le Corbusier, among others.

== Selected publications ==
Between 1975 and 1998, Herlin published 9 mail-order catalogues including: Film, Constructivism and Geometric Abstraction, American Abstract Expressionist Painting, Brain Storms (conceptual-land-body art), and artists' books and periodicals.

His publications also include 25 special lists: Broadcasting and Communications, Pop Art, 20th Century Black Artists in America, Max Beckmann, Jean Dubuffet, CoBrA, among others.

=== Selected publishing ===
- Ken Friedman, Fragments of a book / Odin's Tea Party. Portfolio published in an edition of 10 copies. 1985.
- Jon Hendricks and Jean-Noël Herlin, editors. Yoko Ono: Impressions, La Seyne-sur-Mer, 2001.

=== Selected writings ===
- "Junk mail mon amour," Art on Paper, vol 12, no.1, pp, 44–55, N.Y.C., September/October 2007.
- "Osuna transubstanciada" in Shelley Himmelstein: De Osuna y sus olivos. N.p.: Ayuntamiento de Osuna. (Translated from the original "Osuna Transubstantiated"). 2008.
- "Propos sur la première génération de livres d'artistes in Le livre d'artiste: quels projets pour l'art?" Actes du colloque, 19-20 mars 2010. Rennes: Editions Incertain Sens, 2013 (Collection Grise).

== Lectures ==
- "Collecting the Avant-Garde – Taming the Untamed." Panel discussion, College Art Association Annual Conference, Dallas, 2008.
- Keynote Address. "F.M.R.A." Delivered at: Ressourcer l'archive. L'exemple de l'art américain (1945–1980). École nationale supérieure des beaux-arts de Paris. April 2, 2015.
- Residency at ESAD (Ecole Supérieure d’art et de design), Amiens, November 2019

== Exhibitions ==
Solo

- Jean-Noël Herlin: a junk mail junkie, Bétonsalon - Center for Art and Research, Paris, France, 20 January-20 April 2024.

Curated

- Works on Paper by 24 Artists, Gallery Onetwentyeight, New York. 1988.
- The Design Show: Exhibition Invitations in the U.S.A., 1939–1992, Exit Art/The First World, New York, 1994.

== Additional Sources ==
- John Yau, "An Incomplete History of New York Galleries." (in New York Calling: From Blackout to Bloomberg, edited by Marshall Berman and Brian Berger, London: Reaktion Books, 2007, p. 277.)
