= Émile Saisset =

French philosopher (1814–1863)

- Born: Émile Edmond Saisset; 16 September 1814; Montpellier, France
- Died: 27 December 1863 (aged 49); Paris, France
- Education: École Normale Supérieure; University of Paris
- Occupation: Philosopher

Émile Edmond Saisset (French: [sɛsɛ]; 16 September 1814 – 27 December 1863) was a French philosopher. He was a proponent of French spiritualism.

== Life ==
Émile Edmond Saisset was born at Montpellier. He studied philosophy at the École Normale Supérieure, and carried on the eclectic tradition of his master along with Ravaisson and Jules Simon. In 1842 he was professor of philosophy at Caen, at the École Normale Supérieure. He later moved on to the College de France in 1843. He became a member of the Académie des Sciences Morales et Politiques at the Sorbonne in 1862. Saisset, known as "fashionable psychologist", was associated with the Eclectic school of Victor Cousin.

Saisset's chief works are a monograph on Aenesidemus the Sceptic (1840); Le Scepticisme: Ænésidème, Pascal, Kant (1845); a translation of Spinoza (1843); Précurseurs et disciples de Descartes (1862); Discours de la philosophie de Leibniz (1857) (a work which had great influence on the progress of thought in France); Essai de philosophie religieuse (1859); Critique et histoire de la philosophie (1865).

His untimely death in 1863, "a year after his appointment to the Sorbonne, surely prevented his literary output from being more formidable."
