= Gerald M. Moser =

American-German academic and author (1915-2005)

- Born: 1915; Leipzig, Germany
- Died: March 2, 2005 (aged 89–90); Pennsylvania, United States
- Citizenship: German-American

Gerald M. Moser GOIH (born January 3, 1915, in Leipzig, Germany – died March 2, 2005, in Pennsylvania, United States) was a German-American academic, philologist, literary scholar, emeritus professor, and author. His works were chiefly focused on lusophone African, Luso-Brazilian, and Spanish literature. He also had an interest in Romance languages, and Comparative literature and was among the first scholars in the world to teach and publish the literature of the five former Portuguese colonies in Africa. Moser served as an assistant professor of Spanish at Bridgewater College in Virginia from 1939 to 1941.

== Biography ==
Moser was born around 1915 in Leipzig, Germany to Georg and Erna (Heymann) Moser. In 1935, he received his first degree with double graduation in Latin, German, and French, from the University of Paris, where he was accorded a doctoral degree in comparative literature and Portuguese in 1939. The same year, Moser emigrated to the United States with his family, after the rise of Nazism in Germany and became a citizen of the United States in June 1945. In 1962-63 he lectured on Latin-American history at the University of Lisbon (Faculdade de Letras) as a Fulbright fellow. He is the author of A New Bibliography of the Lusophone Literatures of Africa, a collaboration with Portuguese writer, Manuel Ferreira, and Changing Africa: the First Literary Generation of Independent Cape Verde which was originally published on January 1, 1992, by The American Philosophical Society.

== Works ==
- A New Bibliography of the Lusophone Literatures of Africa. H. Zell, London. 1993. ISBN 9781873836859.
- Changing Africa: the First Literary Generation of Independent Cape Verde
- Essays in Portuguese-African Literature
- Seven Essays on Joseph Priestley. Unitarian-Universalist Fellowship of Centre County PA. 1994.
