= Mièges =

Commune in Bourgogne-Franche-Comté, France

- Commune
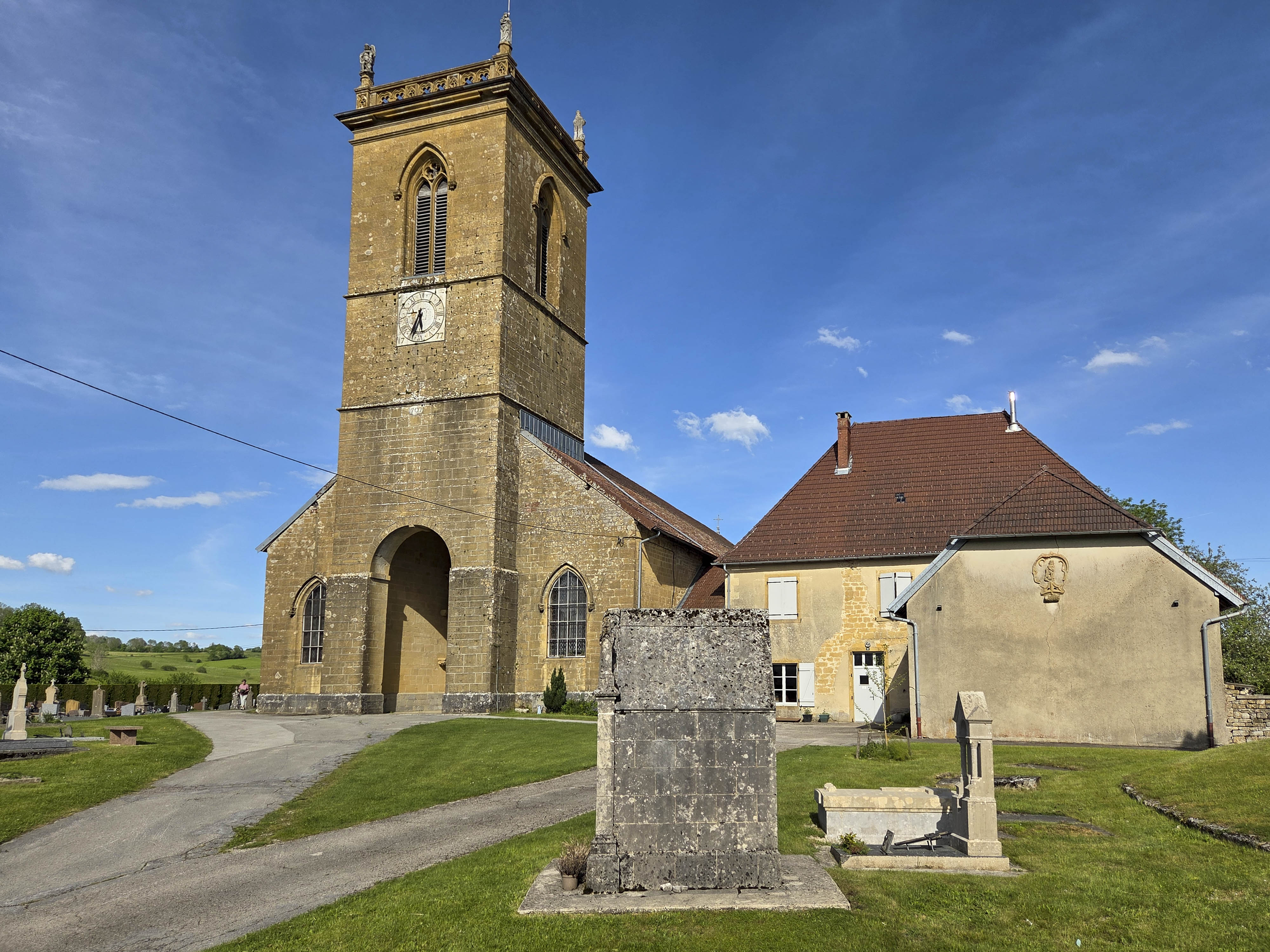
- The church in Mièges
- Location of Mièges
- Location within France Location within Bourgogne-Franche-Comté
- Coordinates: 46°47′00″N 6°02′14″E
- Country: France
- Region: Bourgogne-Franche-Comté
- Department: Jura
- Arrondissement: Lons-le-Saunier
- Canton: Saint-Laurent-en-Grandvaux

Government
  - Mayor (2020–2026): Jean-Claude Compagnon
- Area^{1}: 7.68 km^{2} (2.97 sq mi)
- Highest elevation: 831 m (2,726 ft)
- Lowest elevation: 721 m (2,365 ft)
- Population (2023): 165
  - Density: 21.5/km^{2} (55.6/sq mi)
- Time zone: UTC+01:00 (CET)
  - Summer (DST): UTC+02:00 (CEST)
- INSEE/Postal code: 39329 /39250
- ^{1} French Land Register data, which excludes lakes, ponds, glaciers > 1 km^{2} (0.386 sq mi or 247 acres) and river estuaries.

Mièges (French pronunciation: [mjɛʒ]) is a commune in the Jura department in Bourgogne-Franche-Comté in eastern France. On 1 January 2016, the former communes of Esserval-Combe and Molpré were merged into Mièges.

== Population ==
Historical population
Year	Pop.	±% p.a.
1968	208	—
1975	169	−2.92%
1982	161	−0.69%
1990	160	−0.08%
1999	145	−1.09%
2007	138	−0.62%
2012	128	−1.49%
2017	166	+5.34%
2023	165	−0.10%
Source: INSEE

Population data refer to the area corresponding with the commune as of January 2025.

== See also ==
- Communes of the Jura department
