= Diego Laynez =

Spanish priest (1512–1565)

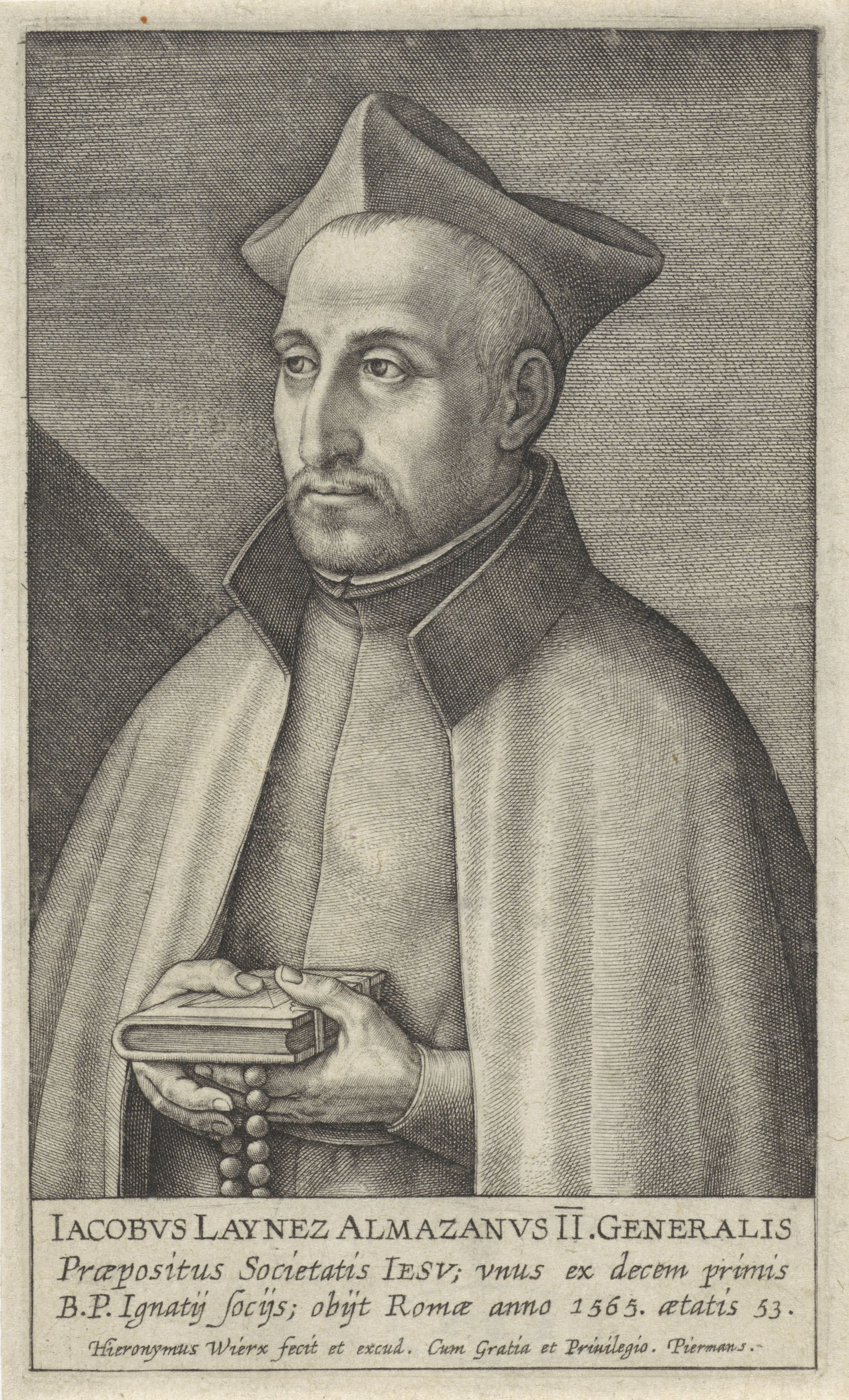
The Very Rev. Diego Laynez, S.J.

Diego Laynez, (Note: First name sometimes translated James, Jacob; surname also spelled Laines, Lainez, Laínez.) SJ (1512 – 19 January 1565) was a Spanish Jesuit Catholic priest and theologian, a New Christian (of converted Jewish descent), and the second Superior General of the Society of Jesus after the founder Ignatius of Loyola.

== Early life ==
Diego Laynez was born in Almazán in Castile. He graduated from the University of Alcalá, and then continued his studies in Paris, where he came under the influence of Ignatius of Loyola. He was one of the seven men who, with Ignatius, formed the original group of Friends in the Lord, later the Society of Jesus, taking, in the Montmartre church, the vows of personal poverty and chastity in the footsteps of Christ, and committing themselves to going to Jerusalem.

Because of unfavourable circumstances (no ship going to the Holy Land) the pilgrimage to Jerusalem fell through, and Laynez with Ignatius of Loyola and the other Friends in the Lord (by then they were ten) offered their services to the Pope. After the Order had been definitely established in 1540, Laynez, among other missions, visited Germany. Laynez was a papal theologian during each of the three periods of the Council of Trent. At one point he was also professor of scholastic theology at La Sapienza.

== Involvement with the Council of Trent ==
=== First period ===
Pope Paul III sent Laynez to Trent to act as the Pope's theologian at the Ecumenical Council. Laynez arrived at Trent on 18 May 1546, five months after the Council opened, with Alfonso Salmeron. Before long, Laynez was recognized as exceptional – one of the first practical consequences was that he was allowed to preach in Trent when not on Council business, whereas the general rule forbade preaching by conciliar theologians. Another exception was the three-hour time limit accorded to Laynez in the council debates, while the standard allotment was an hour.

Laynez's famous speech on imputed and inherent justification (Girolamo Seripando's "double justice" theory) on 26 October 1546 was subsequently written out and incorporated into the Acta of the Council under the title "Disputatio de justitia imputata". By the time Laynez spoke, 37 theologians had spoken on the issue, and 28 had rejected duplex justitia. In his three-hour-long speech, which was widely regarded as the most thorough on the topic, Laynez gave 12 reasons that the proposed "double justice" must be rejected by the Church, including its relatively recent origin and its implied denial of merit. His arguments were consistent with the Council's 13 January 1547 Decree on Justification, which taught in Chapter 16, "we must believe that nothing further is wanting to those justified to prevent them from being considered to have, by those very works which have been done in God, fully satisfied the divine law according to the state of this life and to have truly merited eternal life."

Laynez did not participate directly in the several months of discussions between his speech and the issuing of the Decree because immediately after his speech on justification, Cardinal Del Monte assigned him – along with Salmeron – to prepare a list of Protestant errors regarding the sacraments, as well as a summary of the relevant Church documents and patristic writings on sacraments. The first part of this research was presented to the council on 17 January 1547 by Cardinal Cervini under the headings of "sacraments in general," "baptism" and "confirmation." This research set the terms of debate, which was somewhat less contentious than that concerning justification. The seventh session of the Council promulgated its canons on sacraments in general, baptism and confirmation on 3 March 1547.

Laynez moved with the council to Bologna after the seventh session, where he continued his preparatory work on the sacraments of the Eucharist and penance. He grew frustrated with the slow pace of the work done in Bologna, and left in June 1547. He spent the time between the first and second period of the Council contributing to the reform of prostitutes, convents and dioceses, preaching in Florence, Venice and then in Sicily. From there, he accompanied John de Vaga's fleet on a successful raid of Tripoli, which had been a base for Muslim pirates; he was still in Africa on 5 October 1550 when he was called to Rome.

=== Second period ===
By 22 November 1550, Laynez arrived in Rome to prepare for the second period of the Council of Trent, which eventually opened on 1 May 1551. He attended to a number of projects on his way from Rome to Trent, finally arriving on 27 July, almost three months after the opening, but in plenty of time to contribute, on 8 September, his arguments on the Eucharist leading up to the important 13th session, on 11 October, at which the Decree on the Sacrament of the Eucharist was promulgated. Immediately after his speech, he began the preliminary work for the council's consideration of penance and extreme unction, which he, with Salmeron, presented on 20 October. Laynez often fell ill during this period, but after a period of convalescence he was able to speak on 7 December for three hours on the Mass as sacrifice. The council was suspended for the second time in April 1552, and Laynez went to Bassano to recover his health and then to Padua. Before leaving Trent, however, he met with Melchior Cano, the influential Spanish Dominican, who was embarrassed by his countryman's threadbare cassock and was suspicious of the new religious order. The meeting did not go at all well.

When Ignatius of Loyola died in 1556, Diego Laynez acted as Vicar General of the Society. Because of an internal crisis and difficult relations with Pope Paul IV, the Society's General Congregation was delayed by two years. When it was finally convened and opened on 2 July 1558, Laynez was elected at the first ballot and became the second Superior-General of the Society of Jesus.

=== Third period ===
In 1560, Diego Laynez, now the Jesuit General, was instrumental in arguing that the council should continue to its close, against Ferdinand I, who wished to see a new Council opened and the prior decrees of the Council of Trent forgotten. Pope Pius IV subsequently ordered the council to meet again in the carefully worded Ad ecclesiae regimen of 29 November 1560; the council was eventually opened on 18 January 1562.

Upon Laynez's arrival at Trent in August 1562, he defended the practice of distributing Communion under only one species. Among Laynez's other speeches during the third period of the council are (1) against the Gallican theory that general councils are superior to the Pope, against bishops who wanted to extend episcopal authority at the expense of that of the Pope, in which he argued that the power of the bishop was received through the mediation of the pope and not directly from God (20 October 1562), and (2) a speech in which he committed a rare theological error – he doubted the ability of the Church to invalidate clandestine marriages (23 August 1563), a position rejected by the 24th Session of the Council in Chapter 1 of its Decree on the Reformation of Marriage.

On the death of Pope Paul IV, many cardinals wished to elect Laynez pope, but he fled from them in order to avoid this fate.

== Death and legacy ==
Laynez died on 19 January 1565 in Rome. He was buried in the Roman church of the Madonna Della Strada, soon rebuilt into the Church of the Gesù. His remains were repatriated to Madrid in 1667 and kept in the Jesuit college church there, now the Colegiata de San Isidro. On 31 July 1916 they were transferred to the Church of the Sacred Heart and Saint Francis Borgia on Calle de la Flor Baja. That church was comprehensively destroyed by arson in 1931. Ashes identified as those of Laynez's relics were identified in the ruins and re-interred in the new Jesuit Maldonado church on Calle de Serrano.

He was instrumental in cementing the central role of education in the identity of the Jesuit Order:

[Ignatius's] successor, Diego Laínez (1512-1565), had to deal with the severe shortage of teachers that Ignatius bequeathed to the Society. Laínez found the solution: he elevated the schools to the most important ministry, and he decreed that every Jesuit must teach at some point in his career. On 10 August 1560, Polanco, writing for Laínez, sent a letter to all the superiors of the Society. He began by praising teaching. He then wrote, “There are two ways of helping our neighbors: one is in the colleges by the education of youth in letters, learning, and Christian life. The other is to help all universally through preaching, [hearing] confessions, and all the other means in accord with our customary way of proceeding.” This was extraordinary and unprecedented. Laínez told the members of the Society that the ministry of the schools was as important as all the other ministries combined. Laínez then explained how his directive would be implemented: every Jesuit must ordinarily “bear part of the burden of the schools,” that is, every Jesuit would teach at some point in his career, with a handful of exceptions. Most Jesuits would teach before beginning philosophical studies, some would teach after completing philosophical studies, and still others after completing theological studies. Laínez’s decree determined the careers of almost all future Jesuits.

— Paul F. Grendler, Jesuit Schools in Europe. A Historiographical Essay, Journal of Jesuit Studies (January 2014)

== Writings ==
- Laynez, Diego, Lainii Monumenta: Epistolae et Acta (8 vol.), IHSI, Madrid, 1912–17.
- His Disputationes Tridentinae were published in 2 volumes in 1886.

== Sources ==
- Müller, Hermann, Les Origines de la Compagnie de Jesus: Ignace et Lainez, 1898.
- Fichter, Joseph H., James Laynez, Jesuit, St Louis (USA), B.Herder and Co., 1946, pp. 299.
- Scaduto, Mario, L'Epoca di G.Lainez (2 vol.), Roma, 1964 and 1974.
- Maxcey, Carl, “Double Justice, Diego Laynez, and the Council of Trent,” Church History, Vol. 48, No. 3 (Sep., 1979), pp. 269–278
- Herbermann, Charles, ed. (1913). "James Lainez" . Catholic Encyclopedia. New York: Robert Appleton Company.

Catholic Church titles
Preceded by Ignatius of Loyola	Superior General of the Society of Jesus; 1558–1565	Succeeded by Francis Borgia
