= Hilda Madsen =

- Born: Hilda Chedomille Madsen nee Narracott; December 13, 1910; Belgium
- Died: May 1, 1981 (aged 70)
- Occupations: Artist and dog breeder

Hilda Chedomille Madsen (December 13, 1910 – May 1, 1981) was a British-American artist and dog breeder.

== Early life ==
Born Hilda Chedomille Narracott in Belgium, to an English father (who died in World War I) and American mother (the Fay family of Bennington, Vermont). Her mother was an artist, and Hilda also studied art, graduating from the Sorbonne Art School in Paris.

Her mother remarried an Italian, and Hilda moved to Italy, where she became fluent in Italian (as well as French and English). She met her future husband, Viggo, a Danish ship communications officer, while both were touring the Vatican.

They married and moved to the United States in 1935, living in New York, Pennsylvania and New Jersey, where they raised their three sons.

== Dog breeding career ==
In 1960, Madsen got her first Newfoundland (dog), and over time became a leading breeder, founding Hilvig Kennels. In 1977, Time magazine described her as "the grand dame of Newfoundland dog breeders", and a "revolutionary" in seeking to resolve the conflicting goals of the physical requirements of the show ring and the traditional attributes of a good working dog.

In 1968, she won a rare triple award at the US's most prestigious show, the Westminster Kennel Club show in New York.

== Art career ==
Madsen had several one-woman shows, and was best known for portraits and animal studies.

== Personal life ==
She married Viggo Madsen (born June 9, 1904), a Danish ship communications officer. They had three sons:

- Eric Viggo Madsen (born October 12, 1936; died January 26, 1973)
- Keith Madsen
- Alan Madsen

Among Hilda Madsen's great-grandchildren are: Kip Johnson, a musician studying at UNC in Chapel Hill, North Carolina, and Lane Johnson, a musician at Eastern Guilford High School in North Carolina
