= Alfonso Salmeron =

Spanish scholar

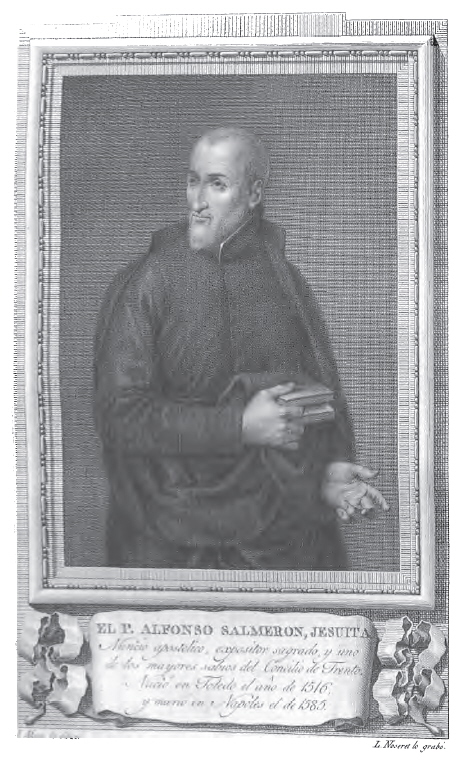
Alfonso Salmerón

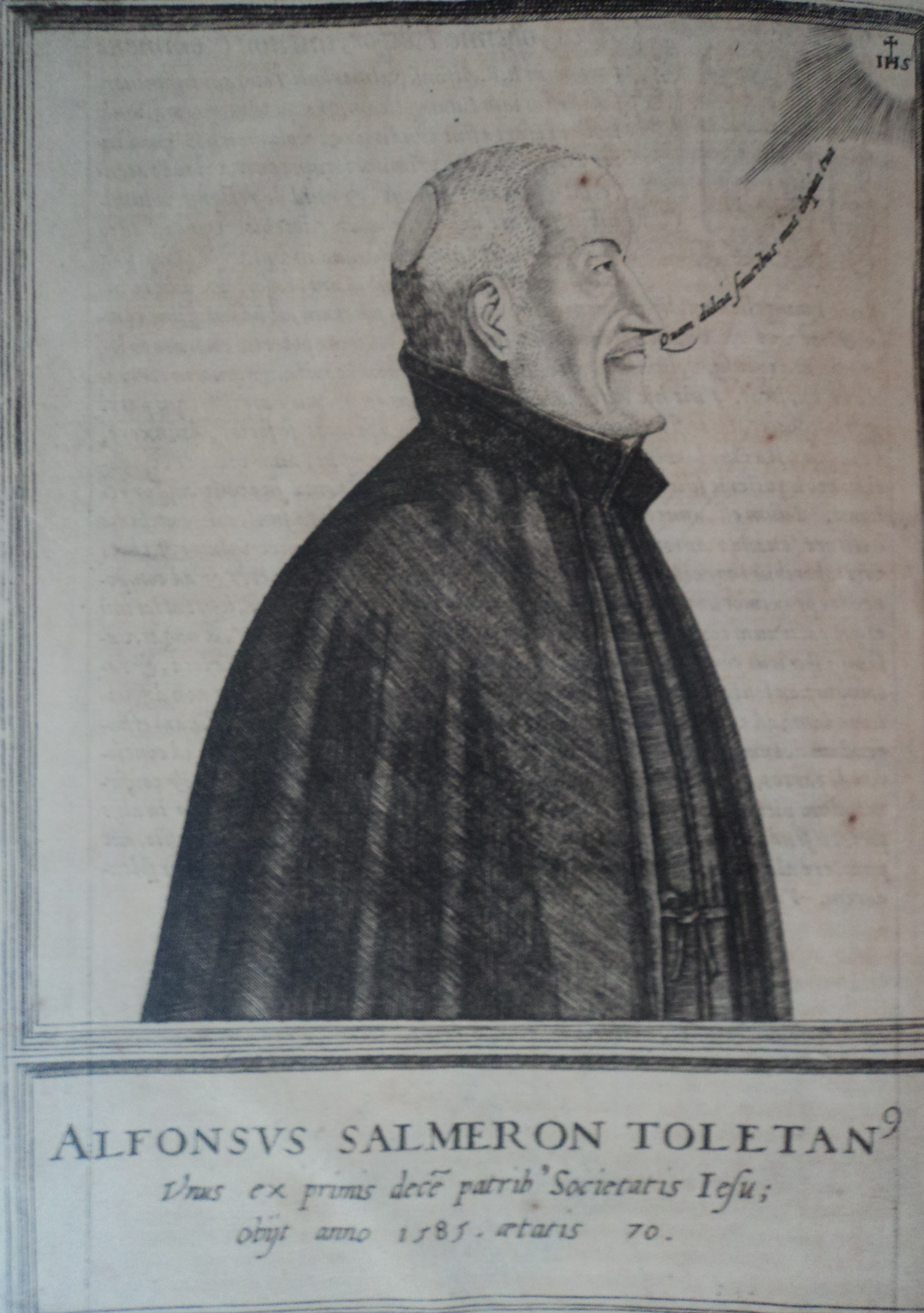
Portrait of Alfonso Salmerón, Jesuit, found in the 1602 edition of Salmerón's commentary on the Gospel (Commentarii in Evangelicam Historiam et in Acta Apostolorum).

Alfonso (Alphonsus) Salmerón, SJ (8 September 1515 – 13 February 1585) was a Spanish biblical scholar, a Catholic priest, and one of the first Jesuits.

== Biography ==
He was born in Toledo, Spain on 8 September 1515. He studied literature and philosophy at Alcalá and then philosophy and theology at the Sorbonne in Paris. Here, through Diego Laynez, he met St. Ignatius of Loyola and with Laynez, St. Peter Faber and St. Francis Xavier, he enlisted as one of the first companions of Loyola in 1534. The small company left Paris on 15 November 1536, reached Venice on 8 January 1537 and during Lent of that year went to Rome. He delivered a discourse before the Pope and was, in return, granted leave to receive Holy orders so soon as he reached canonical age. About 8 September, all the first companions met at Vicenza and all, save St. Ignatius, said their first Mass. The plan of a pilgrimage to the Holy Land was abandoned. Salmeron devoted his ministry in Siena to the poor and to children. On 22 April 1541, he pronounced his solemn vows in St. Paul's-Outside-the-Walls basilica as a professed member of the newly established Society of Jesus.

In the autumn of 1541 Pope Paul III sent Salmeron and Paschase Broët as Apostolic nuncios to Ireland. They landed by way of Scotland on 23 February 1542. Thirty-four days later they set sail for Dieppe and went on to Paris. For two years Salmeron preached in Rome; his exposition of the Pauline Epistle to the Ephesians thrice a week in the church of the Society effected much good (1545). After preaching during Lent at Bologna, he went with Diego Laynez to the Council of Trent (18 May 1546) as theologian to Paul III. The Dogma of Justification was under discussion.

The two Jesuits at once reportedly won the hearts and respect of all; their discourses had to be printed and distributed to the bishops. Both set out for Bologna (14 March 1547) with the council. After serious sickness at Padua, Salmeron once again took up his council work. Salmeron gave statements on issues including justification, Holy Eucharist, penance, purgatory, indulgences, the Sacrifice of the Mass, matrimony and the origin of episcopal jurisdiction.

The next two years were in great part spent in preaching at Bologna, Venice, Padua and Verona. On 4 October 1549, Salmeron and his companions, Claude Le Jay and Peter Canisius, took their doctorate at the University of Bologna, so that they might, at the urgent invitation of William IV of Bavaria, accept chairs in Ingolstadt. Salmeron undertook to interpret the Pauline Epistle to the Romans. Upon the death of Duke William, at the instigation of the Bishop of Verona, much to the chagrin of the faculty of the Academy of Ingolstadt, Salmeron was returned to Verona (24 September 1550). That year he explained the Gospel of St. Matthew.

In 1551 he was summoned to Rome to help St. Ignatius in working up the Constitutions (statutes) of the Jesuit Society. Other work was in store. He was soon (February, 1551) sent down to Naples to inaugurate the Society's first college there, but after a few months was summoned by Ignatius to go back to the Council of Trent as theologian to pope Julius III. It was during the discussions preliminary to these sessions that Laynez and Salmeron, as papal theologians, gave their vota first. When the Council once again suspended its sessions, Salmeron returned to Naples (October, 1552). Pope Paul IV sent him to the Augsburg Diet (May, 1555) with nuncio Lippomanus, and thence into Poland and in April, 1556 to Belgium.

Another journey to Belgium was undertaken in the capacity of adviser to Cardinal Giovanni Pietro Caraffa (2 December 1557). Laynez appointed Salmeron first Jesuit Provincial of Naples in 1558 and vicar-general in 1561 during the former's apostolic legation to France. The Council of Trent was again resumed (May, 1562) and a third pontiff, Pius IV, chose Salmeron and Laynez for papal theologians. The subject to be discussed was very delicate: the Divine origin of the rights and duties of bishops. During the years 1564–82, Salmeron was engaged chiefly in preaching and writing; he preached every day during eighteen Lenten seasons; his preaching was fervent, learned and fruitful. His writings during this long period were voluminous; Saint Robert Bellarmine spent five months in Naples reviewing them; each day he pointed out to Salmeron the portions that were not up to the mark, and the next day the latter brought back those parts corrected. He died at Naples on 13 February 1585.

== Works ==
The chief writings of Salmeron are his sixteen volumes of Scriptural commentaries: eleven on the Gospels, one on the Acts, and four on the Pauline Epistles. Southwell says that these sixteen volumes were printed by Sanchez, Madrid, from 1597 till 1602; in Brescia, 1601; in Cologne, from 1602 to 1604, Sommervogel (Bibliothèque de la C. de J., VII, 479) has traced only twelve tomes of the Madrid edition - the eleven of the Gospels and one of the Pauline commentaries. The Gospel volumes are entitled, Alfonsi Salmeronis Toletani, e Societate Jusu Theologi, Commentarii in Evangelicam Historiam et in Acta Apostolorum, in duodecim tomos distributi (Madrid, 1598–1601). The first Cologne edition, together with the second (1612–15), are found complete. These voluminous commentaries are the popular and university expositions which Salmeron had delivered during his preaching and teaching days. In old age, he gathered his notes together, revised them, and left his volumes ready for posthumous publication by Bartholomew Pérez de Nueros. Hartmann Grisar (Jacobi Lainez Disputationes Tridentinae, I, 53) thinks that the commentary on Acts is the work of Perez; Braunsberger (Canisii epist., III, 448) and the editors of Monumenta Historica S. J. (Epistolae Salmeron, I, xxx) disagree with Grisar.
