= Bernard Miège =

French academic (born 1941)

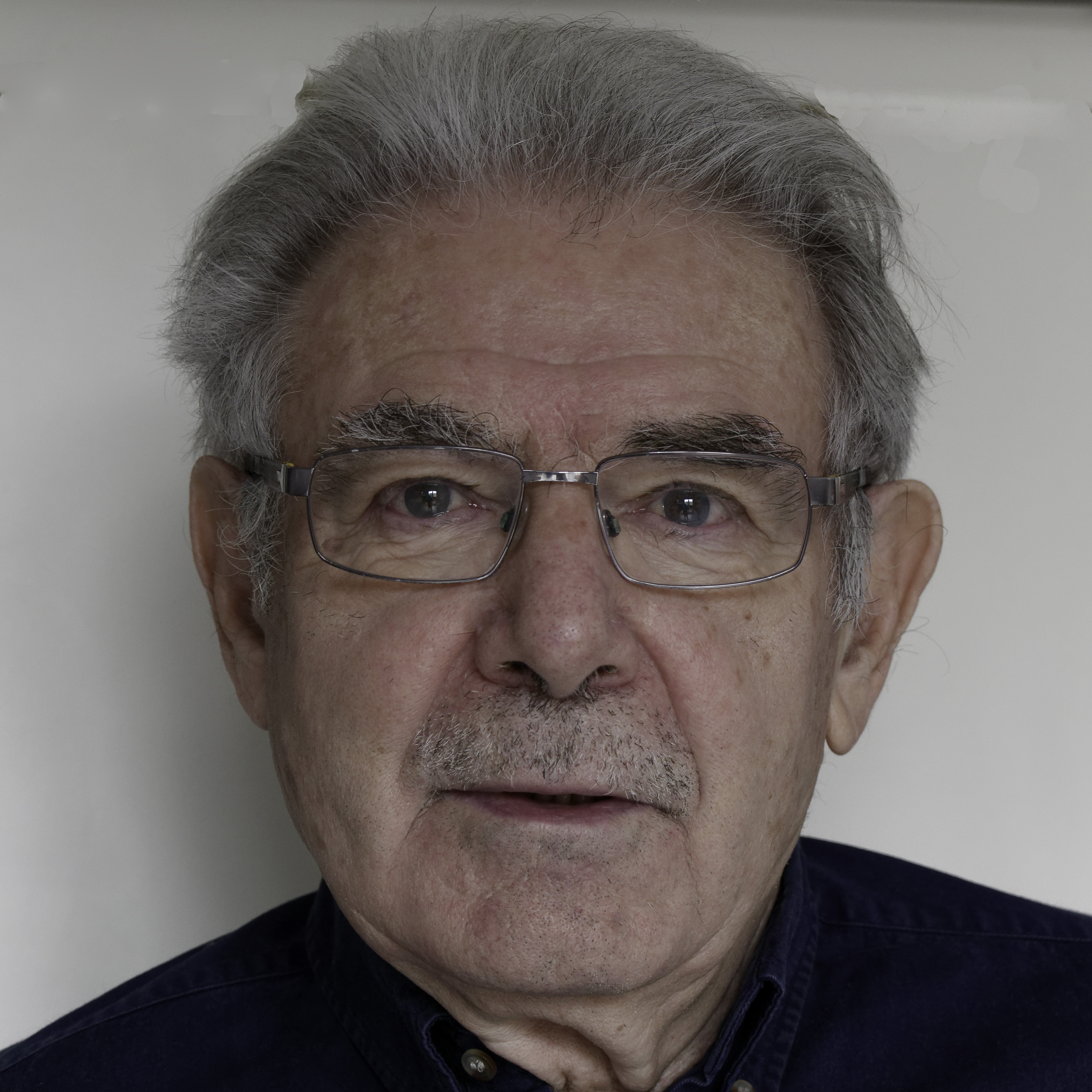
Bernard Miège

Bernard Miège (born 1941) is a French media theorist and academic administrator. He is Emeritus Professor of Communication and Information Science (Professeur émérite de sciences de l'information et de la communication) at Stendhal University in Grenoble. He was educated at Paris University, both in political studies and in economics. He has a Ph.D. in economics (Paris) and another Ph.D. in humanities (Bordeaux). He is the author of fifteen works in the following fields: the cultural industries, the introduction of the technologies of information and communication in the society and in the organisations, and the analysis of the theories of communication.

He is one of the most influential founders of the 'cultural industries', approach, which signified a break from Adorno and Horkheimer's influential theorisation of the 'Culture Industry'. While Adorno and Horkheimer saw culture as subsumed by capital, and by an abstract mode of 'instrumental reason', Miège rejected what he saw as their economic determinism, arguing that the cultural industries were far more complex than their analysis allowed for. They were not a unified field, and he argued that whilst there was indeed increased commodification of culture by the introduction of industrial methods of production, this new technology also created the possibilities for new exciting innovations. Miège's work has been highly influential, in particular on communication studies in the UK, influencing important academic commentators on the media such as Nicholas Garnham and David Hesmondhalgh.

Bernard Miège served as the president of Stendhal University from 1989 to 1994. In 2006 Bernard Miège received an honorary doctorate in communications from Université du Québec à Montréal. He also received an honorary doctorate from the University of Bucharest in 2004.

== Work available online ==
- 2008. «De retour à Compiègne, 30 après». Conférence inaugurale. Congrès de la SFSIC, Compiègne.
- 2008. «Conférence inaugurale» Colloque international de Tunis, 2008
- 2006. «France : l’incomplétude des relations entre journalisme et université» Les enjeux de l'information et de la communication, revue du laboratoire GRESEC.
- 2004. «Économie politique de la communication». Hermès, nº 38.
- 2004. «L’ingénierie éducative d’un point de vue communicationnel». Distances et savoirs. Vol. 2, nº 1. Note de lecture de Alain Chaptal, 2003. Efficacité des technologies éducatives dans l’enseignement scolaire. Paris : L’Harmattan.
- 2002. «Quoi de nouveau dans la recherche française en informatique et communication ?». Actes du Premier colloque franco-mexicain des sciences de la communication, 8-10 avril 2002, Mexico, pages 122–131.
- 2002. «Les TICs: un champ marqué par la complexité et un entrelacs d'enjeux». Conférence, 2001 Bogues. Globalisme et pluralisme.
- 2000. «Le communicationnel et le social : déficits récurrents et nécessaires (re)-positionnements théoriques» Les enjeux de l'information et de la communication, revue du laboratoire GRESEC.
- 1992. Sur le "Cours de médiologie générale" (Régis Debray). Réseaux. Vol. 10, nº 51, pp. 129–132

== Selected works ==
- "La pense communicationnelle", Grenoble: PUG, 1995. ISBN 978-2-7061-0621-7
  - Review, Laramee, A. 2006. "Bernard Miege, La pensee communicationnelle". Communication, Information, Medias, Theories Pratiques. 25, no. 1: 347–350.
- "La société conquise par la communication: la communication entre l'industrie et l'espace public", tome 2, Grenoble: PUG, 1997. ISBN 978-2-7061-0328-5
- "The Capitalization of Cultural Production." New York, N.Y.: International General, 1989.
- "Médias et communication en Europe." Grenoble: Presses universitaires de Grenoble, 1990.
- with Patrick Pajon, and Jean-Michel Salaün. "L'industrialisation de l'audiovisuel: des programmes pour les nouveaux médias." Babel. Paris: Aubier, 1986
- "La Production du cinéma." Média et compagnie(s). Grenoble: Presses universitaires de Grenoble, 1980.
- with Lacroix, Jean-Guy, B and Gaétan Tremblay. "De la télématique aux autoroutes électroniques: le grand projet reconduit." Communication, culture et société. Sainte-Foy, Québec: Presses de l'Université du Québec, 1994.
- "Questionner la société de l'information." Paris: Hermès Science Publications, 2000
