= Eloisa to Abelard =

1717 poem by Alexander Pope

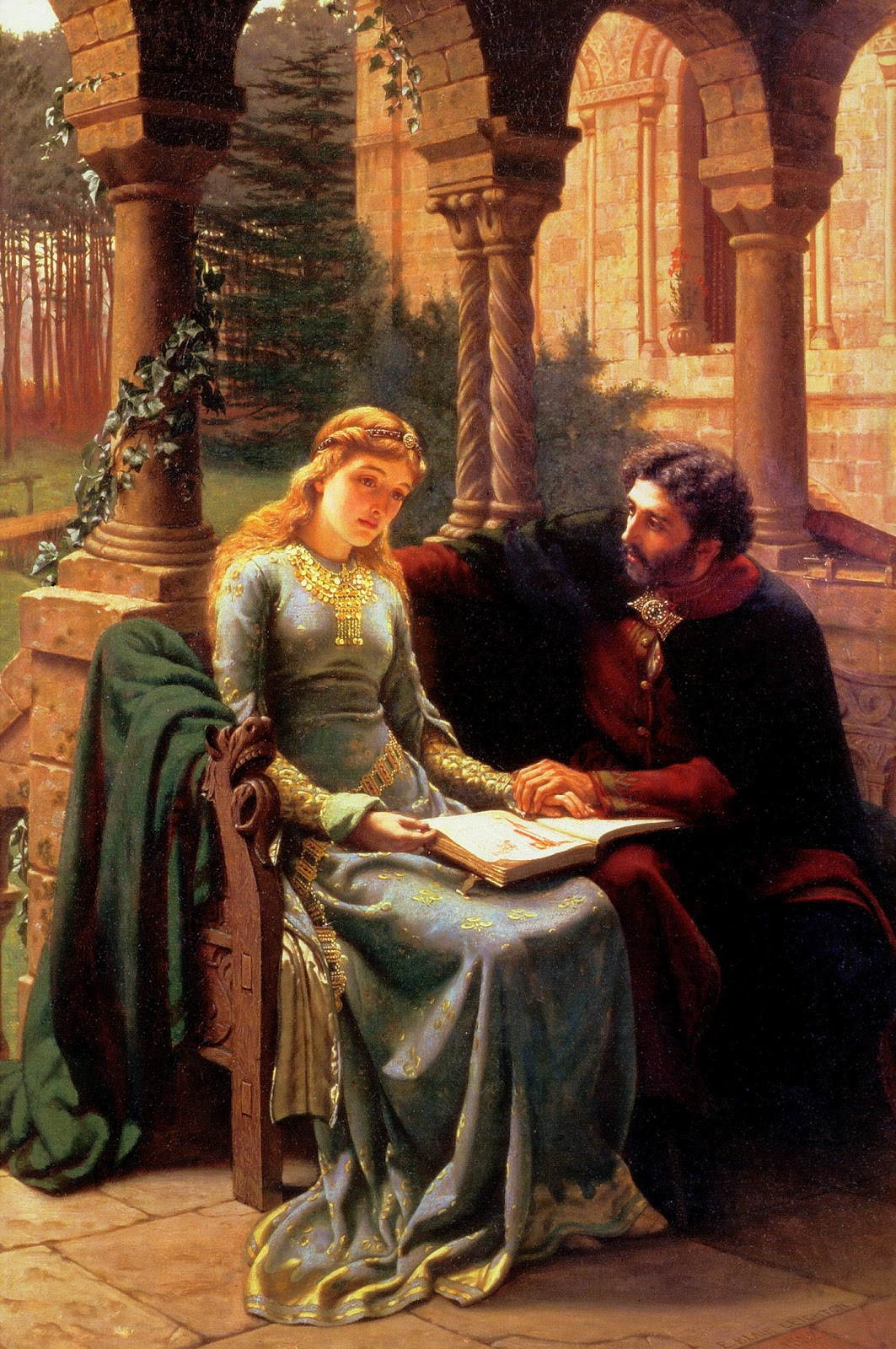
Abelard and his pupil Heloise by Edmund Leighton, 1882

Eloisa to Abelard is a verse epistle by Alexander Pope that was published in 1717 and based on a well-known medieval story. Itself an imitation of a Latin poetic genre, its immediate fame resulted in a large number of English imitations throughout the rest of the century and other poems more loosely based on its themes thereafter. Translations of varying levels of faithfulness appeared across Europe, starting in the 1750s and reaching a peak towards the end of the 18th century and the start of the 19th. These were in the vanguard of the shift away from Classicism and towards the primacy given emotion over reason that heralded Romanticism. Artistic depictions of the poem's themes were often reproduced as prints illustrating the poem; there were also paintings in France of the women readers of the amorous correspondence between the lovers.

== The poem and its background ==
Pope's poem was published in 1717 in a small volume titled The Works of Mr Alexander Pope. There were two other accompanying poems, the "Elegy to the Memory of an Unfortunate Lady" and the original version of the "Ode on St Cecilia's Day". Such was the poem's popularity that it was reissued in 1720 along with the retitled "Verses to the memory of an unfortunate lady'" and several other elegiac poems by different authors.

"Eloisa to Abelard" is an Ovidian heroic epistle of which Pope had earlier published an example translated from the Latin in 1714, "Sappho to Phaon". His own original exercise in this genre was inspired by the 12th-century story of Héloïse d'Argenteuil's illicit love for, and secret marriage to, her teacher Peter Abelard, a famous Parisian philosopher some twenty years her senior. After their affair and marriage, her family took brutal vengeance on Abelard and castrated him, following which he entered a monastery and compelled Héloïse to become a nun. Both then led comparatively successful monastic careers. Years later, Abelard completed the Historia Calamitatum (History of misfortunes), cast as a letter of consolation to a friend. When it fell into Heloise's hands, her passion for him was reawakened and there was an exchange of four letters between them written in an ornate Latin style. In an effort to make sense of their personal tragedy, these explored the nature of human and divine love. However, their incompatible male and female perspectives made the dialogue painful for both.

In Pope's poem, Eloisa confesses to the suppressed love that his letter has reawakened. She recalls their former life together and its violent aftermath, comparing the happy state of "the blameless Vestal" with her own reliving of past passion and sorrow. The memory of it turns the landscape gloomy "and breathes a browner horror on the woods" (line 170). It disturbs the performance of her religious offices, where Abelard's image "steals between my God and me" (line 267). But, since relations between them are now impossible, she advises him to distance himself from her memory and looks forward to the release of death when "one kind grave" will reunite them (line 343).

Pope was born a Roman Catholic and so might be assumed to have an insight into, and a special interest in, the story. He had, however, a recently published source to inspire him and guide his readers. This was The Letters of Abelard and Heloise: with a particular account of their lives, amours, and misfortune by the poet John Hughes, which was first published in 1713 and was to go through many editions in the following century and more. There are several instances of Pope's direct dependence on Hughes’ version of the letters. As one example, where Heloise exclaims "Among those who are wedded to God I serve a man; among the heroic supporters of the cross I am a poor slave to a human passion; at the head of a religious community I am devoted to Abelard only", Pope's Eloisa condenses this to the lines

Ah, wretch! believ'd the spouse of God in vain,
Confess'd within the slave of love and man.

— lines 177-78

== Imitations and responses ==
The final lines of Pope's poem almost seem to invite a response from others:

Such if there be, who love so long, so well;
Let him our sad, our tender story tell;
The well-sung woes will soothe my pensive ghost;
He best can paint 'em, who can feel 'em most.

Whether this was deliberate or not, some seventeen imitations and parodies of his poem had been written by the end of the century, all but two of them cast as Abelard's reply to Eloisa and written in heroic couplets. Although Pope's poem provided the main inspiration, and was frequently mentioned by the authors in their prefaces, there was always Hughes' volume with its historical account in the background. In its later editions the dependency between the two was further underlined by the inclusion first of Pope's poem (from 1755) and then some of the principal responses in following editions.

The poems in question are as follows:

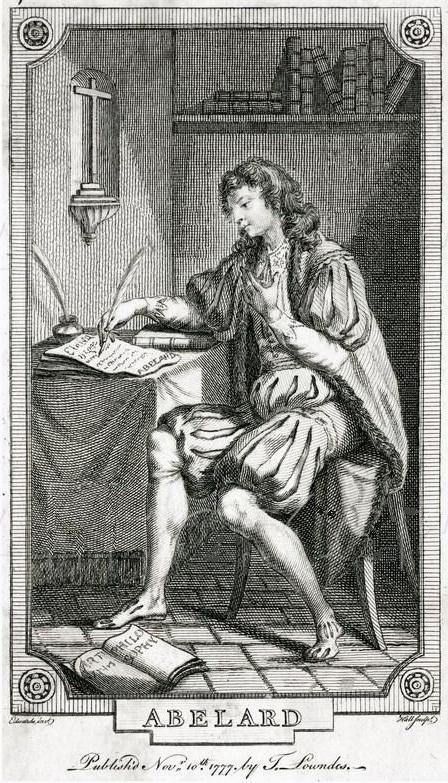
Abelard neglecting his philosophical studies to write to Eloisa, designed by Edward Edwards (London 1777)

- Abelard to Eloisa (1720) by Judith (Cowper) Madan, a disciple of Pope who published her poem anonymously before she was 20. Writing there from a male point of view, she matched Pope, who had adopted a female identity in his poem. For a while, the poem was misattributed to William Pattison, from the circumstance of its unaccountably appearing in his Poetical Works (1728). Beginning with the line "As in my Cell, low prostrate on the Ground," her poem appeared under one or other version of her names in some thirteen miscellanies published between 1747 and 1785. Often it accompanied Pope's poem there, or was even paired with his so as to make the correspondence clearer, as in the collection The Unfortunate Lovers, two admirable poems (1756).
- Fragment of an Epistle from Abelard to Eloisa (1721) by Charles Beckingham, a rebuke that recalls Eloisa to propriety.
- Abelard to Eloisa (1725) by "Petrus Abelardus" [Richard Barford], "wherein we may observe, how high we can raise the sentiments of our heart, when possess'd of a great deal of wit and learning, with a most violent love."
- Abelard to Eloisa, in answer to Mr Pope's Eloisa to Abelard (1725) by James Delacour(t).
- Abelard to Eloisa (1747) by James Cawthorn. A response with many echoes of Pope's original, it was frequently reprinted into the opening decades of the 19th century.
- Abelard to Eloisa by an unknown hand.
- Abelard to Eloisa, by a gentleman of Cambridge (1760).
- Abelard to Eloisa by Oliver Jaques in The London Chronicle (October 19–22, 1765); Abelard is there depicted as having almost conquered his passion.
- In the unfavourably received collection Poems: Containing I. Semira, an elegy; II. Abelard to Eloisa; III. Ambition., (1778). The epistle to Eloisa was later published separately as by Samuel Birch (1757–1841).
- Abelard to Eloisa: a poetic epistle, newly attempted appeared anonymously in 1782, to be followed by a revised version claiming to be a "fourth edition" in about 1784. The latter was accompanied by two additional verse epistles, "Leonora to Tasso" and "Ovid to Julia", as well as other poems and translations. Also mentioned there was that the poem was originally written in 1777; roughly the same text was reproduced in the 1787 edition of Hughes' The Letters of Abelard and Heloise, with the additional information that it had been written in 1777 by a "Mr Seymour".
- Abelard to Eloisa: An Epistle by Thomas Warwick (1783). It was followed early in 1785 by an enlarged and recast version titled Abelard to Eloisa: An epistle, with a new account of their lives and references to their original correspondence.
- Abelard to Eloisa by Edward Jerningham (1792). Also a Catholic, Jerningham gives a greater sense of the historical setting, especially the quarrel with Bernard of Clairvaux and what Jerningham calls his 'sentence of excommunication', details available in Hughes but taken up by no other poet.
- A Struggle between Religion and Love, in an epistle from Abelard to Eloisa by Sarah Farrell (1792).
- Abelard to Eloisa by Lady Sophia Burrell (1753–1802), written in heroic couplets and published as "by a lady" in her Poems (1793). This showed itself hostile to monasticism and neglected to portray the setting as mediaeval.
- Abelard to Eloisa, in an early collection of poems by Walter Savage Landor (1795). In his preface, Landor discusses the difficulty of following Pope, but a commentator has suggested that he was also familiar with Hughes letters.

=== Broadening the genre ===
Over and above such direct imitations, Pope's poem inspired heroic epistles between other couples. Charles Augustine Lea declared on the title page that his "Eliza to Comus, an epistle" (1753) was written as an imitation. Noting its excess of redundant verbiage as compared to Pope's concise style, however, the Monthly Review chided the author for his indiscreet comparison. The later Poetic epistles of Chrysostom and Marcella (Dublin 1777) likewise described itself as "dedicated to the memory of Abelard and Eloisa". Then in 1785 the fourth edition of Seymour's imitation was accompanied by two other epistles, "Leonora to Tasso" and "Ovid to Julia".

The genre was to be broadened by two more imitations whose humorous success brought them frequent reprinting. The first was Richard Owen Cambridge's clever "Elegy Written in an Empty Assembly-Room" (1756). Although its preface describes the poem as "being a Parody on the most remarkable Passages in the well-known Epistle of Eloisa to Abelard", its title also places it among the contemporary parodies of Gray's Elegy Written in a Country Churchyard whose object was to give them an unlikely setting. Imitation of lines from Pope's epistle in this context adds a new level of subtlety.

A later work, Eloisa en deshabille, being a new version of that lady's celebrated epistle to Abelard (1780), was described at the time as "a profligate parody of Mr Pope's Epistle". In this a burlesque and witty version matched Pope's original line for line and in later editions appeared opposite his poem. It was written in anapaestic measure with frequent disyllabic and trisyllabic rhymes, of which one of the most notorious was

Angelic I thought thee—some spirit ethereal!
Nor dream'd that the transports I felt were venereal!

— lines 55-56

The poem has been ascribed to several authors, of whom Richard Porson was once considered the most likely, although a strong case has also been made for John Matthews.

Where the parodies made fun of the passages they aped, the epistolary imitations echoed Pope's themes and language in order to demonstrate their kinship. Thus Richard Barford ends his poem with a similar sentiment to Pope's, that true lovers will express their kinship with Eloisa and Abelard in similar words:

Each sorrowing lover worn with anguish pale,
Trembling shall trace the much-lamented tale.
Grieve to our sorrows, render groan for groan,
And by our boundless passion speak their own.

— lines 373-376

And the third and fourth lines of Seymour's opening, "If cold my blood, my pulse inactive grown,/ I am indeed allied to lifeless stone", is heavily dependent on Pope's "Tho' cold like you, unmov'd, and silent grown,/ I have not yet forgot my self to stone." (lines 23–24)

Samuel Birch compares the felicity of the blameless youth to the jealous perturbation of one who has experienced passion. And, as Eloisa had experienced "twilight groves and dusky caves", so Barford's Abelard reports

Thro' awful glooms, and solemn caves I rove;
Where pensive silence, and her meagre train,
Breathe their brown horrors o'er the extended Plain,

— lines 28-30

James Cawthorne too speaks of "dark, cheerless solitary caves, deep breathing woods and daily-op’ning graves" (which also figure in Pope) subject to "imbrowning glooms" (p. 143). Then, as a final example, Pope's passage beginning "Thy voice I seem in ev’ry hymn to hear" (line 269), in which the progress of the religious service is invaded by thoughts of the loved object, has its parallel in Edward Jerningham's similar description of sacred rites, from which "My guilty thoughts to other altars rov’d" (page 4).

Imitation in these cases, as one commentator points out, is far from being plagiarism, but is a valid constituent of the genre. Furthermore, "since an author of an Abelard to Eloisa would presuppose for his readers a thorough knowledge of Pope's poem, the many replies are evidence of the popularity of Eloisa to Abelard and are evidence, also, of its importance as a literary force."

== A poetry of sentiment ==
One of the reasons for the continued popularity of Eloisa to Abelard was the fact that emotion there was given primacy over reason in a way that heralds later literary trends. The poem, one critic comments, "makes Pope one of the forerunners of the Romanticists". As these trends developed in Europe, translations of Pope's poem were to lead the vanguard.

Amorous melancholy had already been identified as a variety of that emotion by Robert Burton a century before Pope's poem. Melancholy is mentioned in its third line and recurs later, suitably inspired by a Gothic landscape of gloomy forest, overhanging crags, tottering aisles and ancient tombs. It is equally the sentiment emphasised in George Pinto's 'canzonet' near the start of the 19th century, which is a setting of the passage beginning "Soon as the letters trembling I unclose, That well-known name awakens all my woes" (lines 29–48), with its repeated references to tears and sighs.

Tears at the prospect of parting from the loved one are equally the subject of two English paintings inspired by the poem. Angelica Kauffmann's The Farewell of Abelard and Héloïse (1780) pictures an absurdly young Abelard in Renaissance dress clinging to Eloisa's hand as the nuns welcome her at the door of the convent. In Joseph Severn's Scene from Pope's Eloisa to Abelard, Eloisa is already in the nun's habit and looks back with regret at her kneeling lover as she is led into the cloister; the steps behind her are littered with rose petals from the ceremony that has made her just now the ‘spouse of God’. Though the poem is an epistle, it contains narrative memories and the passage portrayed in these cases is

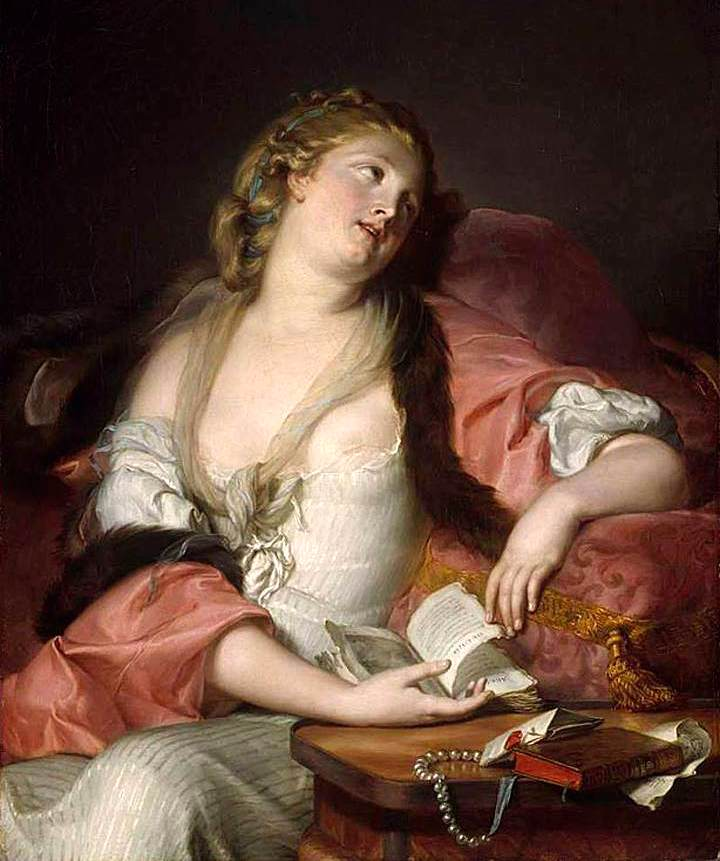
Bernard d'Agesci, Lady Reading the Letters of Heloise and Abélard (c.1780)

Canst thou forget what tears that moment fell,
When, warm in youth, I bade the world farewell?
...
Yet then, to those dread altars as I drew,
Not on the Cross my eyes were fix’d, but you;

— lines 109-10, 115-16

John Opie’s "Eloisa, a nun", a print of which appeared in 1793, only connects with the poem at a tangent. It features a nun rapt in contemplation, her face lit by the grated window above, who is sitting at a table on which are a bible, rosary, skull and hourglass. It was Mary Linwood who identified her embroidered version with the passage from Pope's poem beginning "How happy is the blameless vestal’s lot" when it was exhibited in London at the start of the 19th century. In the poem itself, Eloisa specifically distances her own conduct from this blameless spectacle.

By contrast, some French paintings deriving from the poem feature erotic rather than spiritual rapture as their theme. One of the most notorious, Bernard d'Agesci's Lady Reading the Letters of Heloise and Abelard (see above), is contemporary with Kaufmann's tearful scene. In it a young lady in décolletage looks up from her reading with head thrown back and pupils rolling upward. The book slipping from her grasp may well be a translation of Pope's poem, or even one of those compilations which gathered together imitations so as to form an extended correspondence between the lovers. While the emotion portrayed in Charles Gleyre's Héloise is not so extreme, her seated position and upward glance have more in common with d’Agesci's than with Opie's figure. Furthermore, a print of the painting was later used to illustrate the line "What means this tumult in a Vestal's veins" in an 1892 edition of the poem, carrying the same message of erotic rapture.

Though the Eloisa of Pope's poem is a more nuanced character, her interpretation will depend on other factors operating at the time of her portrayal. One will be the impression left by secondary literature and particularly by studies based on more authentic documents than those which Pope himself had consulted. Another, and a strong one, will be the mediation of the very free translations of his poem in the countries to which it travelled.

== Translations ==
The languages into which "Eloisa to Abelard" was translated included French, Italian, Spanish, Portuguese, German, Danish, Swedish, Polish, Russian and Latin.

Versions in the last of these, it is true, were hardly consequential. The future Rev. George Wakefield made one as an undergraduate exercise near the start of the 1740s. A specimen translation of several of Pope's works, including this epistle, was put forward as a proposal in 1747; then, having gained subscribers, Dr James Kirkpatrick published the whole two years later. J. Wright's Epistola Eloisae Aberlardo followed in 1787 but was dismissed as a waste of effort in the Monthly Review. The original letters on which Pope's poem was loosely based had been written in Latin of a high order in the first place. Turning it back into Latin (except as an academic exercise, according to the Monthly Review) was a self-defeating exercise.

In Europe there was a translation by Johann Joachim Gottlob am Ende (1704–77), several editions of which were published in Germany from 1742 onwards. But when it was sent to Pope himself by the author, he found it inelegant though faithful. In the following century a closer version in hexameters was published by the German Latinist Georg Ludwig Spalding (Berlin 1804). In Italy, meanwhile, Vincenzo Forlani's Latin version in elegiac couplets had accompanied a very free imitation of Pope's poem by Antonio Schinella Conti (Lucca 1792). This, however, was based on Conti's text rather than translated directly from the English.

=== The example of France ===
Since they were of French origin, interest in the story of Eloise and Abelard there predated that in Britain. An account of their "life, love, misfortunes" and a translation of their letters from the Latin by Roger de Rabutin, Comte de Bussy was published in 1687 and frequently reprinted, becoming the major source for subsequent literary reworkings. It served, for example, as groundwork for Pierre-François Godard de Beauchamps’ three verse epistles exchanged between the former lovers in Les Lettres d’Héloise et d’Abailard mis en vers François (1714). Hughes had only published his English versions of the original letters in 1713, followed by Pope’s epistle in 1717.

French translations of "The Rape of the Lock" began in the 1750s, stimulated by the complete edition of Pope's work of 1751. The first was a prose version by Anne-Marie du Boccage (Berlin 1751); it was followed in 1757 by Gabriel-François Coyer's (1707–1782); by the Duchesse d’Aiguillon (1700–72), published from Geneva in 1758; and in the December 1773 issue of the Mercure de France by Dattin de Chartres. In verse the pioneering work was a very free version by Charles-Pierre Colardeau (Paris 1756). More an adaptation in Alexandrins, it retained its popularity over the following decades "despite its high-flown language and impersonal tone, its languor, its elegant circumlocutions and conventional epithets". Its success, according to a later preface, "brought to birth a torrent of little poems under the title Heroides, Epistle, Letter, most of them forgotten by now"; indeed, Colardeau was to contribute to the flow with his own Armide à Renaud: Héroide (Paris 1759). But enough of those solely dedicated to Eloisa and Abelard remained to furnish omnibus collections of what purported to be their long correspondence.

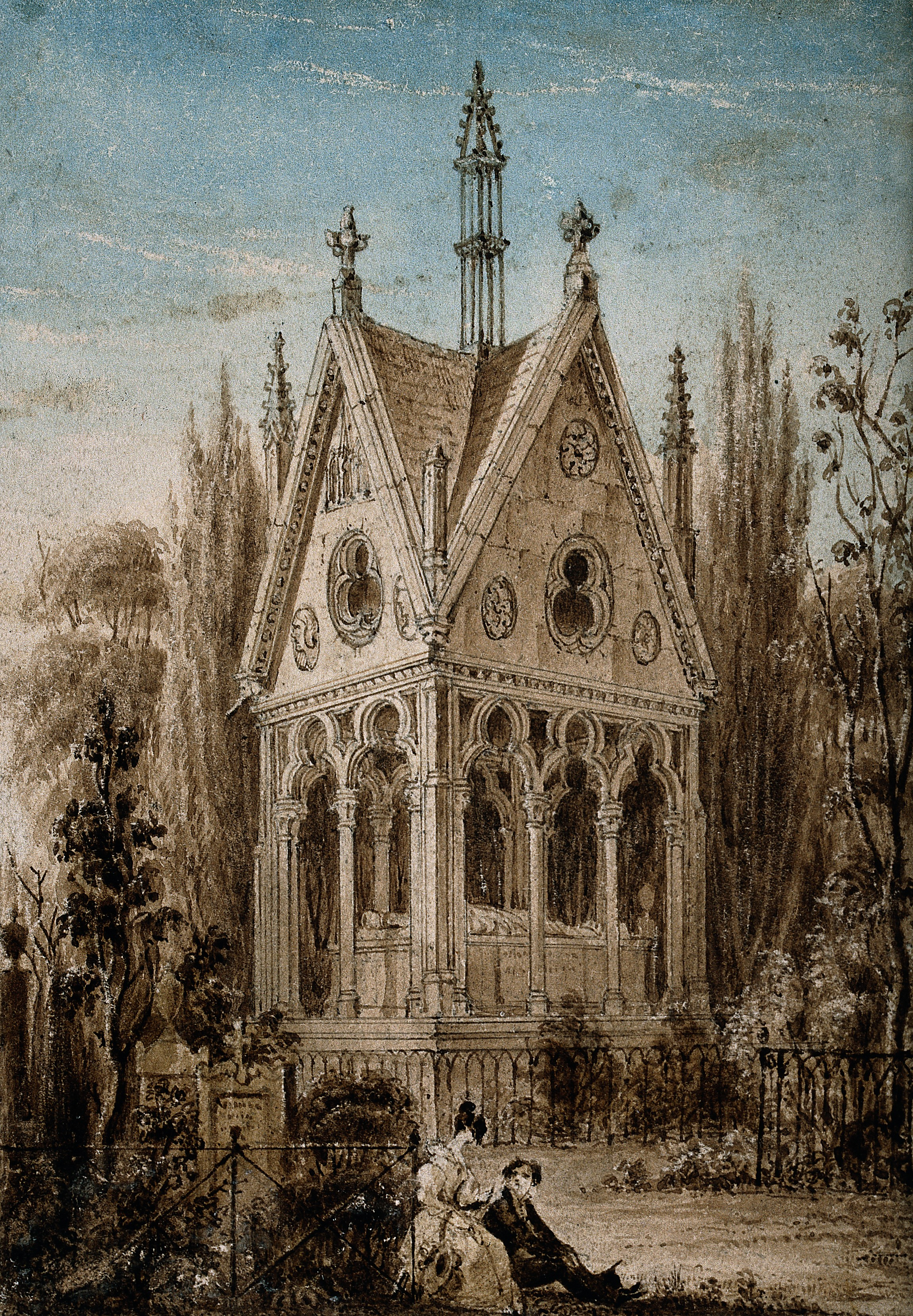
The Abelard and Heloise monument in Père Lachaise cemetery, a coloured print from 1831

These subsequent compilations, taking Ovid's Double Heroides as their model, consist of strings of paired letters furnished by diverse authors that serve as context for translations of Pope's poem not only by Colardeau but subsequent versions as well. They include Lettres et épîtres amoureuses d'Héloïse, avec les réponses d'Abeilard, traduites librement en vers et en prose (Paris 1770), of which there was an augmented London edition in 1780. The first volume of this contained a biographical essay and Latin-based versions of the letters, followed in the second by a dialogue between translations of Pope and of French imitations. Contained there among other inclusions, Colardeau's version of Pope is paired with one of the earlier verse epistles in Abelard's name by De Beauchamps. A closer translation of Pope's poem by Aimé Ambroise Joseph Feutry (1720–89), first published in 1758, is replied to by Claude Joseph Dorat’s 1760 imitation, Epître d’Abeilard à Héloïs. Louis-Sébastien Mercier’s ‘imitation’ of Pope's epistle (published in 1763) is followed by a later revised reply by Dorat dating from 1767. The succeeding Épitre d’Héloïse à son Époux, an imitation of Eloisa's response to the Historia Calamitatum, devised by Sébastien Marie Mathurin Gazon-Dourxigné (1720–84) but dependent on Pope for its occasion and Gothic setting, is followed by a reply by André-Charles Cailleau. Bernard-Joseph Saurin’s 1765 ‘imitation’ of Pope appears without reply but has as companion piece scenes from a play based on the story. Other earlier works uncollected there include a response from Abelard by Henri Lambert d’Herbigny, Marquis de Thibouville (1710–84), published in Paris in 1758, and translated versions of Pope such as that of 1767 by Édouard Thomas Simon (1740–1818) and that of 1771 by Maximilien Henri, Marquis de Saint-Simon (1720–99).

Translations into other Romance languages came much later than in France and demonstrate at times a dependence on the French example. In Spain, at least, there was resistance from the ecclesiastical establishment, where treatment of the theme was condemned by the neo-classical Jesuit Juan Andrés for its wild, pre-romantic imagery and for its blasphemous exhibition of love between those in holy orders. Once books began to appear from the press, the Inquisition stepped in and banned them. These included Juan Maria Maury’s translation into ottava rima (Malaga 1792) and a very free adaptation of Colardeau’s already free French version, Cartas de Abelardo y Eloisa (Salamanca 1796), together with a reply from Abelard of the translator’s own invention. The works are now ascribed to Vicente Maria Santibañez and were reprinted in the 19th century in the kind of omnibus editions using the double Heroides format that were still being reprinted in France.

The earliest Portuguese translations to appear were the Carta de Heloize a Abailardo (Porto 1785), followed by Epistola de Heloyza a Abaylard: composta no idioma inglez por Pope e trasladada em versos portuguezes (London 1801), a version in nine-syllable verse which has been credited to José Nicolau de Massuelos Pinto. Many more followed in the first half of the 19th century and are increasingly mediated through the French imitators of Pope.

The first imitation in Italian was Antonio Schinella Conti’s Elisa ad Abelardo: Epistola, a very free piece in terza rima beginning "Abelardo, Abelardo! O quanto amore", which was frequently anthologised. The 1792 Lucca edition of the poem also incorporated Vincenzo Forlani’s version in Latin elegiacs on opposite pages. Thereafter, as in France, Conti’s poem was incorporated into a frequently reissued life and letters edition, where it was accompanied by Pope’s poem in English and Colardeau’s in French. Other versions were published soon after: in 1804 by Creofilio Smintéo, beginning "In queste solitudini profonde", and in 1814 by G.B. Boschini, beginning "In queste oscure e solitarie celle".

=== Northern Europe ===
At first French mediation of the poem was dominant in Germany via collections of Pope’s works that, though published from German presses, were translated directly into French. Among these was included the 1751 prose rendering by Anne-Marie du Boccage already mentioned. The first German-language Brief der Eloise an den Abelard, published anonymously in 1760, was in fact based on Colardeau’s translation, the French text of which appeared opposite the German alexandrines. Several more translations from the original English followed, though they were of varying quality. Between 1779-1804 no less than ten appeared in both verse and prose. Two of the most prominent, by Gottfried August Bürger and Johann Joachim Eschenburg, were frequently published, in some cases together, both from German and from Austrian presses. Burger’s Heloise an Abelard, more an improvisation than a translation, was followed in its Swiss edition (Zurich 1803) by Pope’s original; from the same press in 1804 appeared J. Rothstein’s free prose version, accompanied by Colardeau’s French translation and Pope’s poem as well.

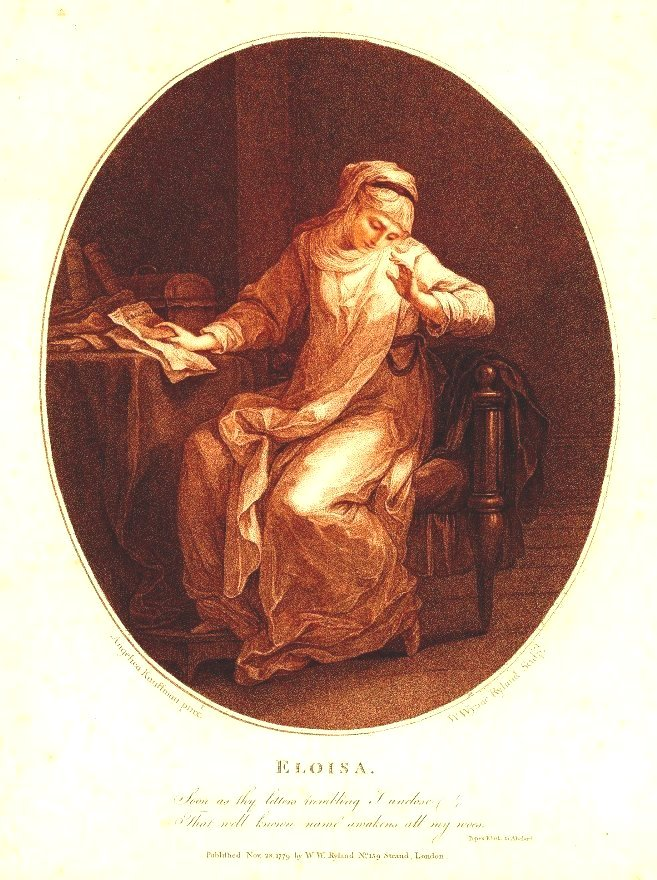
Eloisa reads Abelard's letter: a 1779 print of Angelica Kauffmann’s painting

In Russia Pope’s "Eloisa to Abelard" appealed to the literary Sentimentalism that served as a prelude to Romanticism. The first translation was Epistola Eloizy ko Abelardu, tentatively ascribed to Mikhail Kheraskov, which was published five times between 1765 and 1791. The next, the 1794 Éloiza k Abelardu by Vladislav Ozerov, was in fact a translation of Colardeau's work. Likewise, Vasily Zhukovsky‘s version of 1806, produced at the height of interest in the theme, also drew its main inspiration from France. "No other literary work was more popular, in Russia as in France, than the epistle of Eloisa to Abelard. [His translation] was very free, in the French fashion, by which it was quite possibly inspired."

The connection of the Polish Listy Heloizy i Abeilarda (Kraków 1794) with Alexander Pope was at a distant remove. The work of Stefan Chomentowski and Tomasz Kajetan Węgierski (1756–1787), it consists of versions of Colardeau's reworking of Eloisa's epistle to Abelard and of his reply as imagined by Dorat. The choice of French models, and the fact that the book appeared while the Polish state was in the final throes of the partition crisis, is referable to the politics of national renewal instituted as part of the Polish Enlightenment.

On the other side of the Baltic, Scandinavian translations began with Göran Rothman’s Eloisas bref til Abelard (Stockholm, 1765), to be followed in Sweden by the translations of Pehr af Lund (Stockholm, 1782), Joachim Wilhelm Liliestråle (Uppsala, 1782) and the anonymous and much freer Eloisa till Abelard (Uppsala 1822). There was no Danish version until the start of the 19th century, when Steen Steensen Blicher published his Elegie til Abailard efter Pope in the journal Tilskuer in 1817.

== Later thematic parallels ==
The more popular English treatments of the Eloisa and Abelard story, particularly the poems by Pope and Cawthorn, continued to be reprinted in the opening decades of the 19th century, bringing fresh imitations in their wake. They began with John Gwilliam's "Paraclete, or the Sorrows of Abelard and Heloise", a long epistle from Heloise in couplets that appeared first in The Mourning Wreath (London 1813) and was reprinted next year in The Bower of Bliss. Of two later reworkings, J. Treuwhard's Abelard to Eloisa, a moral and sentimental epistle, was privately printed in 1830. The Epistle from Abelard to Eloise, originally published in 1828 by Thomas Stewart (of Naples), was in heroic couplets and prefaced by a poem to Pope.

The Hughes letters, along with Pope's poem and a selection of imitations, were now beginning to be reprinted in the United States too and also brought poetic responses in their train. That by Joseph Rodman Drake, written before 1820, is a short lyric in octosyllabics with the message that shared suffering will lead to shared redemption beyond the grave. Though it carries the title "Abelard to Eloise" in a holographic copy, it was also published without it after his death. John Witt Randall's "Abelard and Eloisa", published in 1856, is a sequence of six poems, written in various forms and fashioned more as poetical addresses than letters. They follow the story of the lovers from courtship to death, and sections 2, 3 and 6 are spoken by Eloisa. At the end of the century there appeared a further Abelard to Heloise (1891) by the young Italian immigrant to California, Lorenzo Sosso.

Two women also took up the subject later. Christina Rossetti's "The Convent Threshold" (written in 1858) is, according to one source, "a thinly disguised retelling of Alexander Pope's Eloisa to Abelard", although others are more cautious in seeing an influence. The poem is a surging monologue of enlaced rhymes in octosyllables, driving along its theme of leaving earthly passion behind and transmuting it to heavenly love. It is also a rare example of a woman being allowed her own voice without male intervention. The Australian writer Gwen Harwood went on to use the situation as a weapon in the gender war. Writing under the assumed name of Walter Lehmann in 1961, she placed two modernistic sonnets, "Eloisa to Abelard" and "Abelard to Eloisa", in a magazine without its male editors realising that the letters of their first lines spelt an offensive message.

== See also ==
- Eternal Sunshine of the Spotless Mind

== Bibliography ==
- Anonymous (1725). Abelard to Eloisa. London: J. Bettenham for T. Warner. OCLC 731578206.
- Charrier, Charlotte : Héloise dans l’histoire et dans la légende, Paris 1933; pp. 444 – 470
- Effross, Susi Hillburn: "The influence of Alexander Pope in 18th century Spain", Univ. of North Carolina 2004.
- Fairer, David, "The Verse Letter" (chapter 4) in English Poetry of the Eighteenth Century, 1700-1789, Routledge 2003, pp.60-78
- Froldi, Rinaldo: El tema literario de Eloísa y Abelardo y las Heroidas de José Marchena, Barcelona 1989
- J.H. Heinzelmann, "Pope in Germany in the 18th century", Modern Philology 10.3, University of Chicago 1913, pp. 360-64
- Hughes, John, The Letters of Abelard and Heloise: with a particular account of their lives, amours, and misfortune. London: W. Lowndes, B. Law, T. Longman, R. Baldwin, and J. Bew, 1788.
- Pope, Alexander (1963). Butt, John (ed.). The Poems of Alexander Pope (a one-volume edition of the Twickenham text ed.). Yale University Press. ISBN 0300003404. OCLC 855720858.
- Wright, Lawrence S., "18th century replies to Pope's Eloisa", Studies in Philology, University of North Carolina 1934, pp.519-33
