= The Ruins, or Meditations on the Revolutions of Empires =

1791 book by Volney

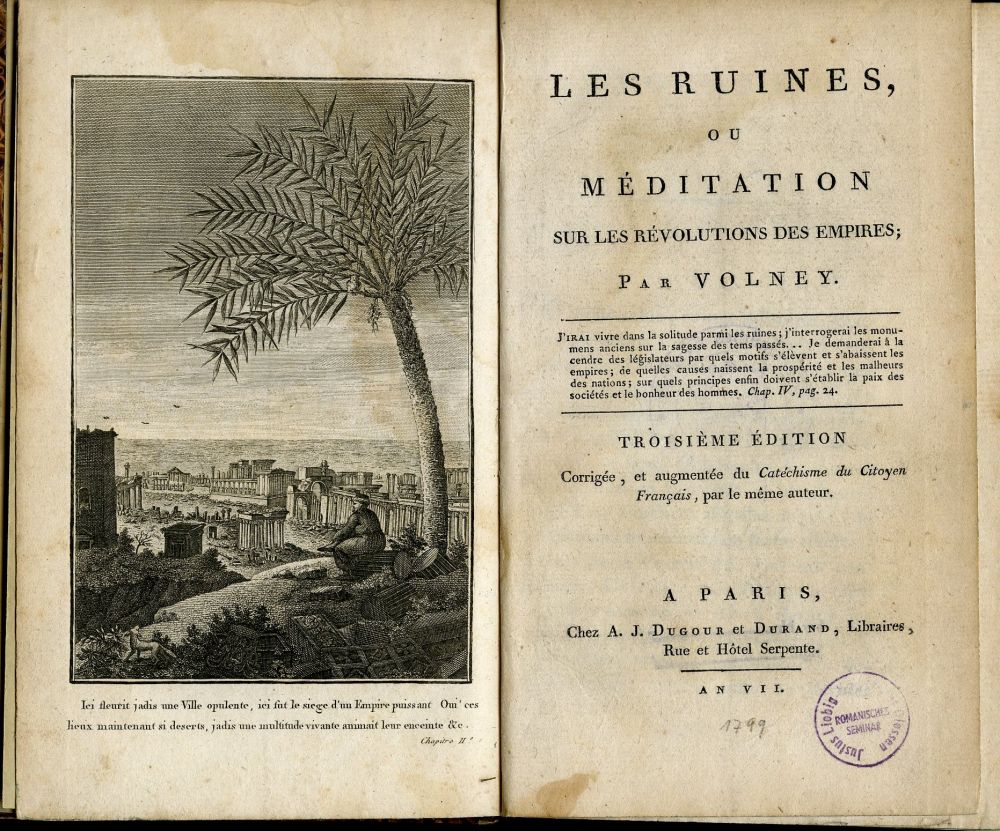
- Frontispiece and title page of the third edition (1799).
- Original title: Les Ruines, ou Méditation sur la Révolution des Empires
- Translator: Thomas Jefferson and Joel Barlow
- Language: French
- Subject: Philosophy of history
- Publication date: 1791
- Publication place: Paris

The Ruins, or Meditations on the Revolutions of Empires is a book by Volney, first published in 1791.

Contemplating the remains of Palmyra by moonlight, the narrator is visited by the "Genius of Ruins and Tombs". The Genius carries him into orbit around the Earth and teaches him the natural law governing the rise and fall of civilizations. Together they witness the outbreak of the French Revolution, followed by the convening of a "General Assembly of Nations" bringing together all the peoples of the world.

The book concludes with a naturalistic account of the origins of myths and religious beliefs. Volney defines Christianity as an "allegorical worship of the sun" and challenges the historical existence of Jesus.

At once an heir to the Age of Enlightenment and a work of pre-Romanticism, The Ruins combines melancholy lyricism with sarcasm, and eschatological anxiety with revolutionary hope. (Note: Jean Gaulmier described it as a "rationalist apocalypse".)

The Ruins enjoyed considerable success both in France and internationally, particularly in Great Britain and the United States, where President Thomas Jefferson personally oversaw its translation.

== Background ==
=== Sources of inspiration ===
The dialogue between a young man and a semi-divine mentor recalls Fénelon's The Adventures of Telemachus, the most widely read work in eighteenth-century France after the Bible.

The dreamlike atmosphere of the Orient evokes One Thousand and One Nights, first translated into French by Antoine Galland in 1704.

The idea of a journey through space around the Earth was borrowed from Voltaire, whose pseudonym inspired that of Volney. In Micromégas (1752), a giant from the star Sirius and his Saturnian companion observe from space the tiny inhabitants of Earth and their boundless pretensions.

The author of The Ruins also acknowledged his intellectual debt to Condillac, who, together with Voltaire, had introduced the empiricist and sensualist philosophy of John Locke to France. Volney frequented the salon of Baron d'Holbach and that of Madame Helvétius, the widow of Claude Adrien Helvétius, both disciples of Condillac.

Several Enlightenment writers had reflected on the causes of the decline and fall of civilizations, including Montesquieu, the Abbé de Mably (Condillac's brother), and, in Britain, Adam Ferguson and Edward Gibbon.

The chapters of The Ruins devoted to the history of religions were inspired by the theories of Charles-François Dupuis, who is said to have shared with Volney the manuscript of The Origin of All Religious Worship, then still in preparation.

Although Volney travelled through Ottoman Egypt and Syria between 1782 and 1785, he never visited Palmyra, the opening setting of The Ruins. Instead, he drew upon the descriptions published by Robert Wood and James Dawkins, the two archaeologists who had rediscovered the site.

=== The poetics of ruins ===
Since the Renaissance, ancient ruins had long provided poets with a privileged object of contemplation, from Petrarch to Joachim du Bellay and Jacques Grévin, and later James Thomson, Louis Racine, and Aimé Feutry in the eighteenth century. (Note: An epistle on ruins by M. de Coeuilhe won the Académie française prize in 1768.)

The itineraries of every Grand Tour converged on Rome. The remains of the Roman Empire formed an essential stage in the education of Europe's elites, who collected the capricci of Panini and the engravings of Piranesi.

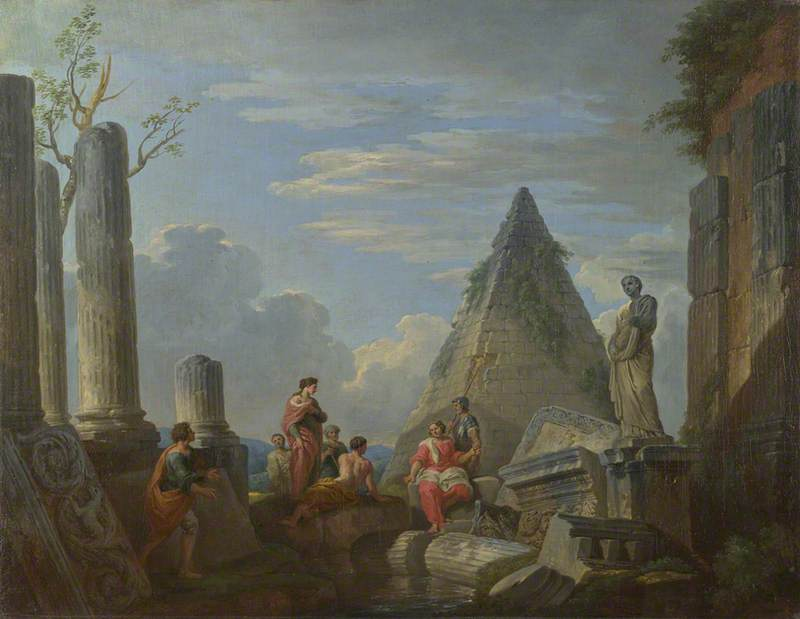
Roman ruins with figures (1730), Giovanni Paolo Panini, National Gallery.

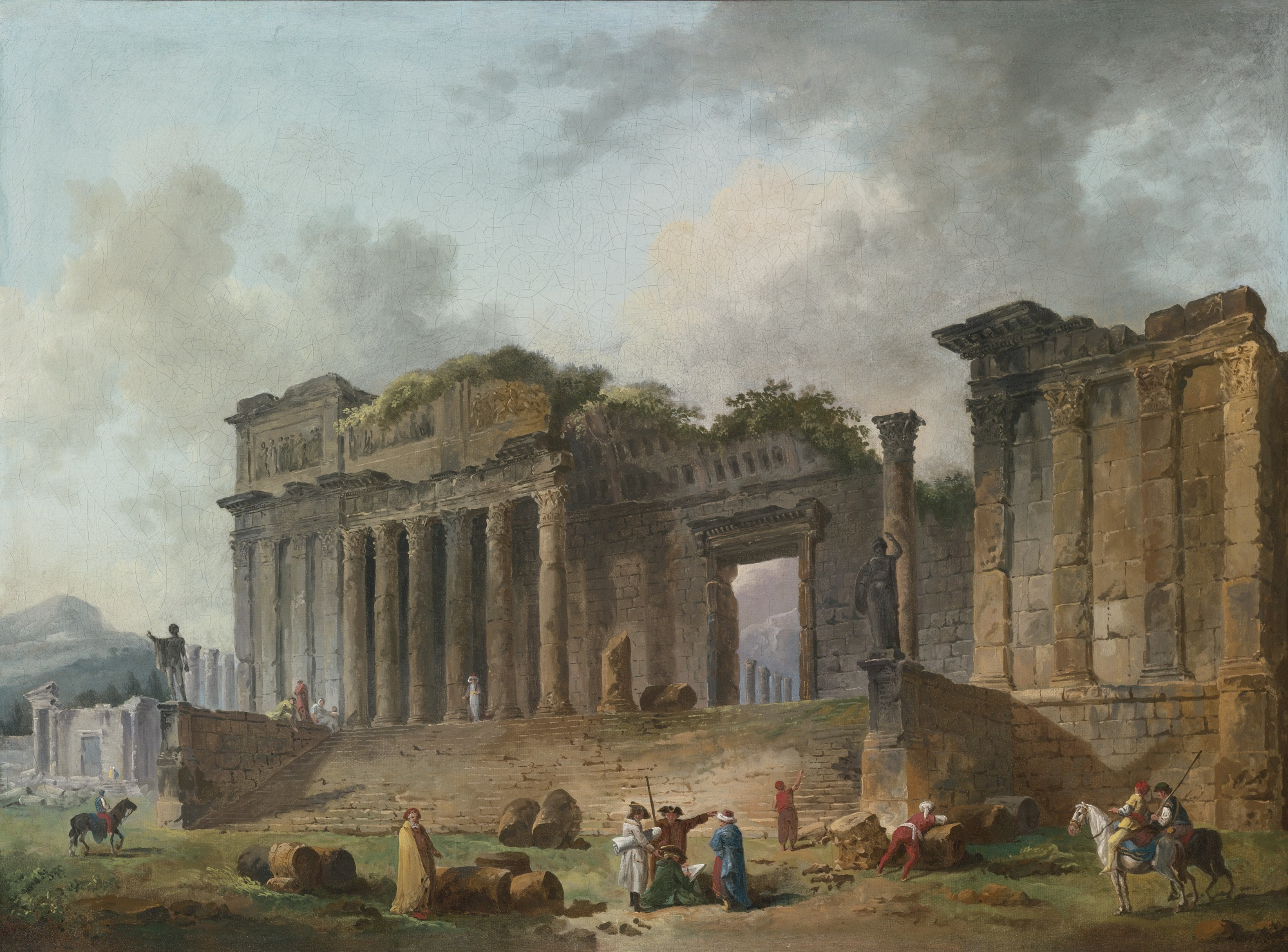
An architectural capriccio with an artist sketching in the foreground (1782), Hubert Robert, private collection.

Diderot, whom Volney met at the salon of Baron d'Holbach, commented on the paintings of Hubert Robert, exhibited at the Salon of 1767:

"We fix our gaze upon the remains of a triumphal arch, a portico, a pyramid, a temple, a palace; then we turn back upon ourselves and anticipate the ravages of time [...]. We alone survive an entire nation that is no more. There you have the first principle of the poetics of ruins. [...] Everything is annihilated, everything perishes, everything passes away. Only the world itself endures."

In his novel The Year 2440: A Dream If Ever There Was One (1771), Louis-Sébastien Mercier imagined the Palace of Versailles lying in ruins. There, the narrator encounters Louis XIV, restored to life by divine justice. Shedding "a torrent of tears", the king finally becomes aware of the suffering that he had inflicted upon his people.

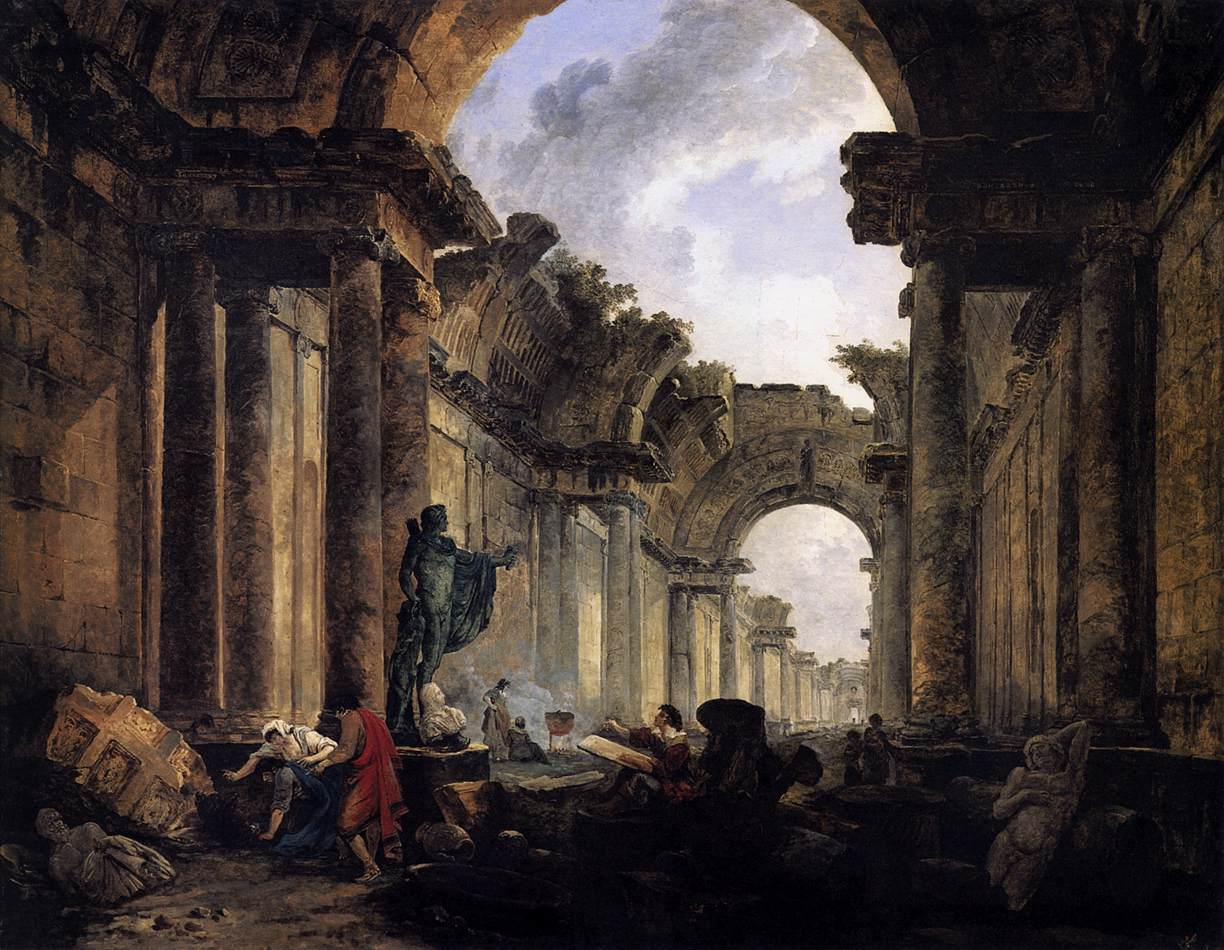
Imaginary View of the Grande Galerie of the Louvre in Ruins (1796), Hubert Robert, Louvre.

Edward Young, the author of the Night Thoughts, found in cemeteries a privileged setting for philosophical meditation. He also invited his readers to rise above the world and observe it from the heavens:

"Come, my ambitious! let us mount together, and from the Clouds, where Pride delights to dwell, look down on Earth. What seest thou?"

James Macpherson's The Poems of Ossian likewise inspired the elegiac tone of the opening chapters of The Ruins. Young and Macpherson, two pioneers of British Romanticism, enjoyed widespread popularity in late eighteenth-century France.

=== Publication during the French Revolution ===
Volney began writing The Ruins in 1787, following the publication of his Travels in Egypt and Syria. Elected as a deputy of the Third Estate in 1789, he depicted the creation of the National Constituent Assembly in the central chapter of his book, entitled "The New Age".

The Ruins was published shortly after the Constitution of 1791 came into force. As announced by Le Moniteur Universel on 13 September 1791, the work was offered for sale at the price of five pounds by three Parisian bookseller-publishers. A second, revised edition appeared a few months later.

== Summary ==
The narrative opens with an invocation: "Hail, solitary ruins, holy sepulchres, and silent walls!" The ruins teach all humanity that all are equal before death, that oppression is temporary, and that wealth is ultimately vain. They raise the mind above "the weary struggle of the passions."

=== The Genius of Palmyra ===
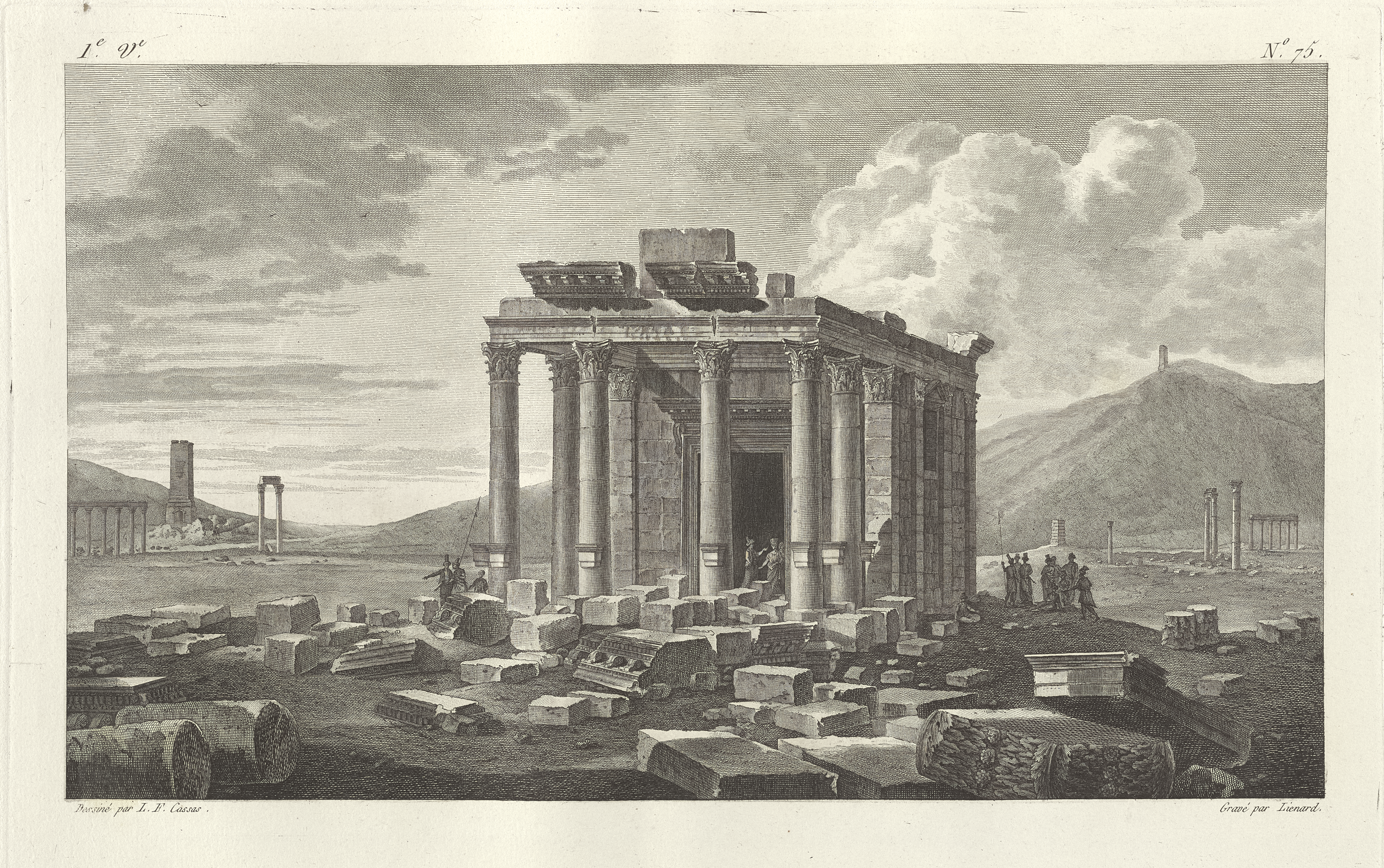
Temple of Baalshamin at Palmyra (1799), drawing by Jean-Baptiste Liénard after Louis-François Cassas.

Volney returned in memory to the journey he had made through Ottoman Syria in 1784, during the reign of Sultan Abdul Hamid I. After three days crossing the desert, he reached the ruins of ancient Palmyra. At dusk, seated upon the shaft of a fallen column, the traveller falls into a profound reverie.

Of the once flourishing and populous city of Palmyra, only its "gloomy skeleton" remained before him. He realized that his native Europe might one day suffer the same fate:

Who knows if on the banks of the Seine, the Thames, the Zuiderzee, where now, in the tumult of so many enjoyments, the heart and the eye suffice not for the multitude of sensations, who knows if some traveller, like myself, shall not one day sit on their silent ruins, and weep in solitude over the ashes of their inhabitants, and the memory of their former greatness.

Absorbed in melancholy, Volney attributes the death of civilizations to "the justice of heaven fulfilling its decrees" whose designs are beyond human understanding.

Suddenly, as night falls, a spectre appears and addresses him in a grave, resonant voice:

Cease then, mortals, to accuse the decrees of Fate, or the judgments of the Divinity! [...] the source of man's calamities is not in the distant heavens, it is beside him on the earth; it is not concealed in the bosom of the divinity; it dwells within himself, he bears it in his own heart. (Note: Baron d'Holbach had already written in his The System of Nature: "Let man therefore cease to seek beyond the world he inhabits beings who may grant him a happiness that nature refuses him... It is because mankind has been mistaken that it has made itself unhappy. Failing to understand nature, it created gods who became the sole objects of its hopes and fears.")

The Genius explains that the history of civilizations is governed by "eternal laws, prior to all codes and all prophets."

Since thy heart, O mortal, with sincerity seeketh truth; since thine eyes can still recognize her through the mist of prejudice, thy prayer shall not be in vain. I will unfold to thy view that truth thou invokest; I will teach thy reason that knowledge thou seekest; I will reveal to thee the science of ages and the wisdom of the tombs.

=== The Earth Seen from the Heavens ===
The Genius lays his hand upon Volney's head, and his mind, filled with a "celestial flame", is borne aloft into the air. "Floating in the void", he finds himself in orbit around the Earth. His eyes, sweep across the Northern Hemisphere, from the Atlantic Ocean to Siberia and Malaysia. His gaze falls upon the valley of the Nile, where he discerns the Giza pyramid complex. (Note: "There a people, now forgotten, discovered, while others were yet barbarians, the elements of the arts and sciences. A race of men now rejected from society for their sable skin and frizzled hair, founded on the study of the laws of nature, those civil and religious systems which still govern the universe.") He also beholds the ruins of Babylon and Palmyra, where he had stood only moments before.

=== The Rise and Decline of Civilizations ===
Throughout history, the Genius explains, the human species has been governed by "self-love, the aversion to pain, and the desire for happiness." Primitive man, "naked in body and in mind", like the other animals, was motivated solely by the instinct for survival and reproduction. In pursuit of these ends, he gradually learned to master his environment through "the repeated experience of diverse accidents."

To overcome their individual weakness and confront the dangers of nature, human beings united into tribes. Wearied by the uncertainties of hunting and gathering, they domesticated animals and invented agriculture. The abundance of harvests enabled them to establish ever larger sedentary communities.

So long as self-love remains in accordance with natural needs, the Genius explains, it encourages mutual assistance and progress. But when men seek limitless pleasures and covet the possessions of others, it becomes "a corrupting poison", giving rise to "a general and disastrous discord." The Genius reveals to the traveller "the twofold source of all the sufferings of human life": ignorance and greed. Ignorance causes human beings to mistake their true interests, while greed leads them to sacrifice the interests of others to their own.

At times, insolent and audacious, the leaders of a nation forged its chains from within itself, and mercenary greed established political despotism; at other times, hypocritical and cunning, they brought down from heaven deceitful powers and a sacrilegious yoke, and credulous greed established religious despotism.

Injustice, he continues, originated within the family through patriarchy and patrilineal descent:

Because the head of the household could exercise absolute authority within his home, he distributed or withheld his property without equality or justice, and paternal despotism laid the foundations of political despotism. (Note: Volney appended the following note to this passage: "Countless facts demonstrate that among every people in its infancy, in the savage and barbarous state, the father, the head of the family, is a cruel and insolent despot. The wife is his slave, his children his servants [...]. This condition is still found among our uncivilized peasants. As civilization advances, manners become gentler and the condition of women improves." The idea that woman was originally man's slave – a conception now largely rejected – was widespread among eighteenth-century writers. In the Histoire des deux Indes, Denis Diderot wrote: "The family was the first society, and the first government was patriarchal.")

Conflicts gradually spread to every level of society: "man armed himself against man, family against family, tribe against tribe", until the Earth became "a bloody theatre of discord and brigandage." By departing from the laws of nature, humanity wandered into "a labyrinth of errors and calamities."

Human beings soon realized that greed ultimately turned against itself: "what one man seizes today will be taken from him tomorrow." They therefore devised laws to restrain it. Justice is the condition of a nation's prosperity. Whenever individuals' natural interests – security, the protection of property, and freedom of labour – are frustrated, societies decline. Laws must direct self-love toward the common good.

This equilibrium, however, is fragile. As societies expand, (Note: In the earliest sedentary communities, land is distributed equally, encouraging agricultural production and allowing rapid population growth. Agricultural surpluses foster the development of crafts, trade, and the arts. Yet this increasing prosperity, benefiting above all the most avaricious, already contains the seeds of decline.) social relations become more complex, laws prove inadequate and are gradually subverted, and those entrusted with restraining greed succumb to it themselves. No form of government is immune to such corruption: even democracy degenerates when magistrates appropriate the powers entrusted to them.

Society fragments into rival groups seeking to monopolize political power. Laws cease to protect the people, instead justifying slavery and sanctioning hereditary privilege. The aristocracy, controlling taxation and military force, becomes a caste distinct from the mass of the population.

When a civilization remains relatively small, several circumstances may limit these abuses. Threatened by external enemies, rulers have an interest in preserving the loyalty of their people. Internally, traditions of independence and the absence of widespread poverty make tyranny difficult: a despot cannot long impose his authority upon free men who own property and are capable of resisting or emigrating if their rights are violated. (Note: Volney here follows the English liberal tradition. In The Commonwealth of Oceana (1656), James Harrigton argued that the wide distribution of property prevented the emergence of arbitrary power. Likewise, in the Two Treatises of Government, John Locke regarded the protection of property as one of the principal purposes of political authority: should a government violate the rights of its citizens, they retained a right of resistance.) Such conditions foster civic cohesion: every citizen is prepared to bear arms because in doing so he also serves his own interest. (Note: This idea dates back to antiquity. In the Politics, Aristotle argued that moderately sized city-states were best suited to preserving liberty. A class of independent small landowners provided the strongest safeguard against tyranny when citizens themselves were responsible for the city's defence. In the Histories, Polybius attributed Rome's strength to its balanced constitution and to its army of citizen landowners, whose private interests coincided with those of the Republic. Niccolò Machiavelli developed the same idea in the Discourses on Livy, maintaining that a free state must rest upon an armed citizenry rather than mercenaries. Montesquieu, in The Spirit of Law, argued that republics could endure only within a limited territory, whereas large states tended toward despotism while smaller ones fostered civic virtue and restrained rulers. Jean-Jacques Rousseau likewise developed these themes in The Social Contract.)

Yet cities absorb cities, and kingdoms absorb kingdoms, until vast empires emerge. Peoples lose their laws and customs. Eventually, "a single man rules millions of his fellow men against their will or without their consent." The monarch exploits social divisions, governing less by force than by fostering rivalry among his subjects, drawing "his strength from their weakness."

This despotism, together with the corruption that accompanies it, brings about economic decline. Increasing taxation discourages labour. Princes divert wealth toward luxurious expenditure – palaces, tombs, and religious monuments – to the detriment of useful public works. The concentration of landed property ruins small landowners and divides society between "a class of opulent idlers and a multitude of impoverished hirelings." Production declines, and societies lose their vitality, collapsing beneath their own weight.

Empires, weakened from within, vulnerable to the "accidents of nature", and incapable of withstanding crises, become easy prey for invaders. The societies born of these conquests perpetuate the division between conquerors and conquered, thereby deepening injustice.

This tragic condition also finds expression in religion. Overwhelmed by their misfortunes and unable to explain them, human beings imagine heavenly tyrants in the likeness of those who oppress them on earth. These "gloomy and misanthropic" religions come to glorify suffering, condemn self-love, and turn mankind away from every earthly enjoyment. (Note: "Mistaking his pleasures for crimes and his sufferings for acts of expiation, man came to love pain and to renounce self-love. [...] Life appeared to him no more than a wearisome journey, a painful dream; his body became a prison obstructing his happiness; and the earth a place of exile and pilgrimage. [...] Ah! Now I have recognized man's falsehood! Seeing the portrait he has drawn of the Divinity, I said to myself: no, it was not God who made man in His own image; it was man who fashioned God in his own.") Such an "antisocial" morality in turn hastens the decline of civilizations.

The Genius concludes that mankind are "the eternal instruments of their own misfortunes." History demonstrates that societies rise or fall according to whether they observe or violate "the physical laws of the human heart." So long as rulers persist in "the ways of falsehood and tyranny," and peoples remain imprisoned by superstition and ignorance, civilizations are destined for ruin.

The traveller sadly realizes that the lessons of experience are invariably forgotten: each new generation suffers from collective amnesia, and peoples seem condemned to repeat the same mistakes.

==== The War between the Russians and the Turks ====
Still in orbit around the Earth, Volney perceives columns of smoke rising above the shores of the Black Sea and the Sea of Azov, over Crimea and the Kuban. Seen from the heavens, it is the war between the Russians and the Crimean Tatars, which had recently culminated in the annexation of the Crimean Peninsula by Empress Catherine II. (Note: Catherine II rewarded Volney with a gold medal for his Considérations sur la guerre des Turcs et des Russes (Considerations on the War between the Turks and the Russians, 1788).)

On both sides, the belligerents pray for victory. Ottoman Muslims and Orthodox Russians alike hope that God will favour their cause. They promise sacrifices, fasts, and pious foundations, while their priests interpret military reverses as signs of divine punishment.

God, who in the immensity of the heavens directest the movement of worlds, and peoplest the abyss of space with millions of suns! say what do these human insects, which my sight no longer discerns on the earth, appear in thy eyes? To thee, who art guiding stars in their orbits, what are those wormlings writhing themselves in the dust? Of what import to thy immensity, their distinctions of parties and sects?

The Genius recounts to the traveller the history of the Ottoman Empire, before prophesying its downfall. The early Ottoman Turks were hardened conquerors, "skilled in the art of war". Discipline and courage were esteemed as virtues. The empire's prosperity rested upon effective institutions capable of accommodating the interests of the peoples they governed. Its decline resulted from the opposite causes: the luxury of the sultan's court, the corruption of the pashas, and increasing taxation, all of which hindered agriculture and commerce.

The Ottomans, the Genius explains, repeated the same mistakes as the civilizations that had preceded them. The calamities afflicting their empire stemmed from the greed of its rulers and the ignorance of its people, not from the will of God.

=== The Hope of Human Progress ===
As he listens to the Genius, the traveller gives way to despair. How can this endless cycle of misery and violence ever be broken? One conqueror merely replaces another, while oppression endures. Confronted with "the perversity of those who govern, and the debasement of the governed", he falls into a nihilistic frame of mind:

What remains for the virtuous man but to mingle his ashes with those of the tombs?

The Genius replies:

Beware of the illusions and paradoxes of the misanthrope. Dissatisfied with the present, he imagines a fictitious perfection in the past, which is only the mask of his sorrow. He praises the dead out of hatred for the living, and beats children with the bones of their fathers.

The greatness of ancient civilizations should not deceive us, he continues. Those societies were perpetually at war and rested upon slavery.

History shows that since the time when mankind lived in the savage state, immense progress has been achieved. Human knowledge has steadily increased, and some peoples have greatly improved their conditions of existence. During the past "three centuries", the Genius declares, progress has accelerated thanks to the invention of printing, "a sacred art, a divine gift", which enables knowledge to be disseminated simultaneously among millions of people and transmitted to future generations.

As enlightenment spreads, each individual will come to recognize his true interests. The power of sovereigns will increasingly be restrained by "public opinion". The weak will discover that unity is their strength.

By the law of imitation, the example of one people will be followed by the others; they will adopt its spirit and its laws. Even despots, seeing that they can no longer preserve their power except through justice and beneficence, will moderate their rule out of necessity and rivalry, and civilization will become universal.

The Genius foresees the end of war and the emergence of a universal human community. Already, he says, "a cry of liberty, uttered upon distant shores, has echoed across the Old Continent" – an allusion to the American Revolution. At that cry, "a secret murmur against oppression arises within a great nation. [...] A mighty movement is about to begin; a new age is about to dawn! An age of astonishment for the multitude, of surprise and terror for tyrants, of emancipation for a great people, and of hope for the whole Earth!"

==== Obstacles to Human Progress ====
The Genius's optimism leaves the traveller unconvinced. Still suspended above the Earth, he surveys the civilizations that inhabit it. None appears capable of escaping decline:

All Asia lies buried in the deepest darkness. The Chinese, governed by an insolent despotism, by blows of the bamboo and the drawing of lots, constrained by an immutable code of gestures and by the fundamental defect of an ill-constructed language, offer me, in their abortive civilization, nothing but an automaton people. The Indian, crushed by prejudice and bound by the sacred ties of caste, languishes in incurable apathy. The Tartar, whether nomadic or settled, remains ignorant and ferocious, living in the barbarism of his ancestors. The Arab, endowed with a noble genius, wastes his strength and the fruits of his virtues in the anarchy of his tribes and the jealousies of his families. The African, degraded from the condition of man, seems irretrievably condemned to servitude. In the North I see only degraded serfs and peoples reduced to herds, the playthings of great landowners. Everywhere ignorance, tyranny, and misery have struck nations with stupor; vicious habits, corrupting the natural sentiments, have destroyed even the instinct for happiness and truth.

The progress of the Enlightenment "in a few regions of Europe", he tells the Genius, has not prevented the worst atrocities:

Are not these peoples who call themselves civilized the very ones who, for the past three centuries, have filled the Earth with their injustices? Are they not those who, under the pretext of commerce, have devastated India, depopulated the New World, and even today subject Africa to the most barbarous slavery? Shall liberty arise from the bosom of tyrants, and justice be dispensed by hands that plunder and covet?

The hope of the improvement of mankind therefore appears illusory:

The more I reflect upon the nature of man, the more I examine the present condition of societies, the less possible a world of wisdom and happiness appears to me.

=== The French Revolution ===
From the heavens, the traveller suddenly beholds immense agitation spreading across France. The entire nation realizes that it is being plundered from within: despite the fertility of its soil, the labour of its people, and peace abroad, the French live in poverty and are crushed beneath the weight of taxation. "What hidden enemy is it, then, that devours us?"

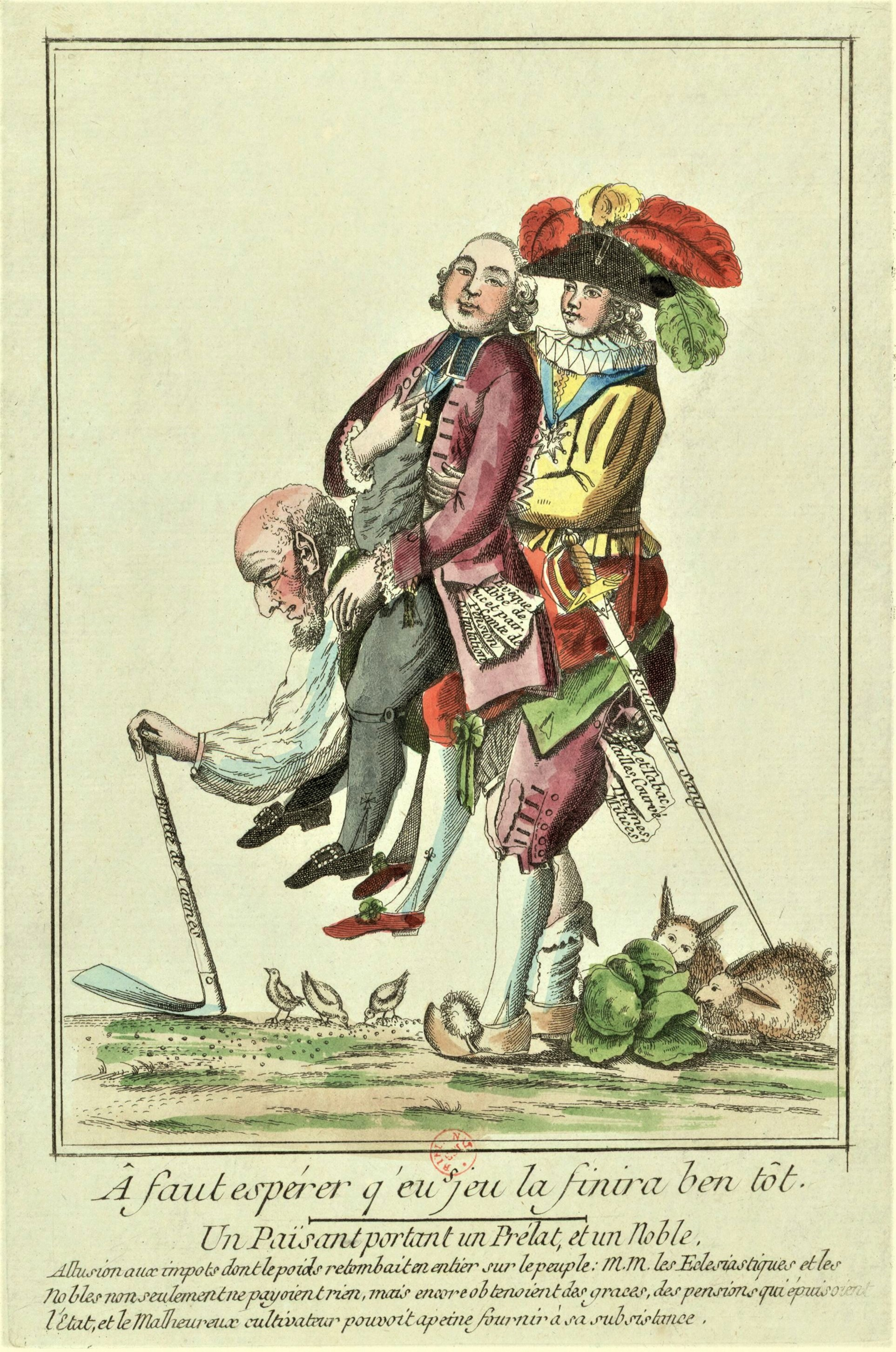
Anonymous caricature of a peasant carrying a clergyman and a nobleman (1789).

The inhabitants of the kingdom divide into two camps. On one side stands the overwhelming majority, their emaciated bodies clothed in rags. On the other is a minority of priests, nobles, financiers, and government officials, displaying "in the richness of garments embroidered with gold and silver, and in the fullness of their faces, the marks of leisure and abundance." They live without labour, govern society, and appropriate the wealth it produces.

A dialogue begins between the people and the privileged orders. The nobles first seek to justify their position by invoking the glory of their ancestors. Their pretensions are ridiculed by the people, who recall the common origins of many recently ennobled families.

The defenders of the old order then appeal to the king and obedience to the law, but the people reply that the king can be legitimate only insofar as he serves the common good. The privileged finally resort to force, yet the soldiers refuse to fire upon those from whom they themselves have sprung: "We too are the people."

The final refuge of the old order is religion. The clergy invoke faith, obedience, and the need for intermediaries between God and mankind in order to secure salvation in the next world. Each of their arguments is methodically refuted by the people, who declare their services unnecessary.

The privileged lament: "All is lost—the multitude has become enlightened." The people answer: "All is saved, for now that we are enlightened, we shall not abuse our strength. We seek only our rights. We have our grievances, yet we forget them. We were slaves; we might command in our turn. We desire only to be free, and liberty is nothing other than justice."

Raising "an immense throne in the form of a pyramid", the sovereign people resolve to delegate part of their authority to representatives, since the making of laws requires knowledge and leisure that citizens occupied with their work do not possess. These representatives are to reflect the diversity of the nation's interests and enact laws in accordance with "morality and reason."

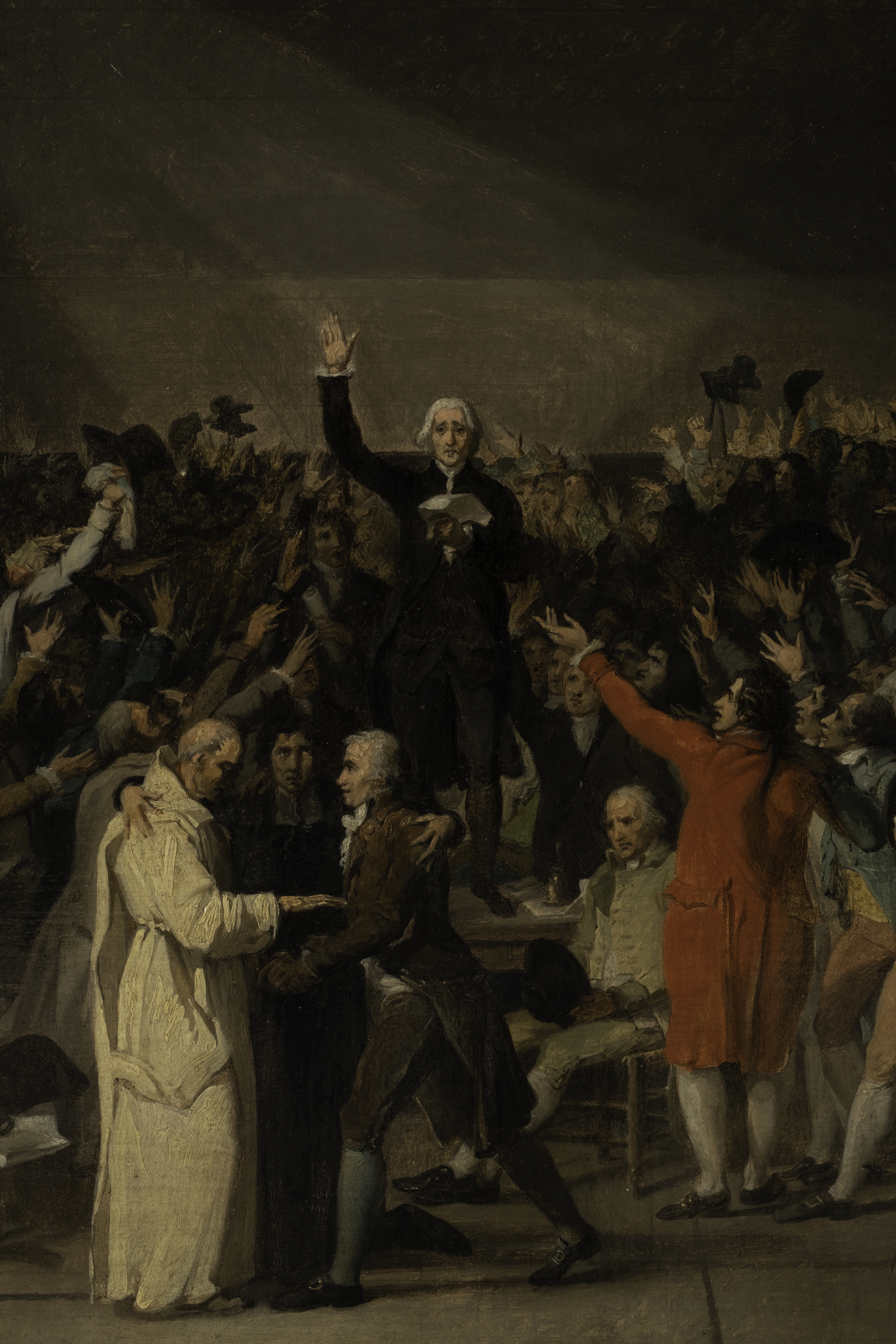
Detail of the Tennis Court Oath of 20 June 1789, by Luc-Olivier Merson after Jacques-Louis David, Musée Carnavalet.

The people remind them of the strict limits of their mandate: "The power that we confer upon you belongs to us. We entrust it to you as a deposit, not as property nor as an inheritance." The representatives themselves will be the first subject to the laws and, once their office ends, will return to their place among the people, rewarded only by public esteem and gratitude. They adopt equality and liberty as the founding principles of the new political order: all men possess the same rights, and each is "the absolute proprietor of his own person."

The new society then choses its symbols. The people erect an altar bearing a balance, a sword, and a book. They adopt a banner that becomes "the standard of universal justice." Millions of men raise their arms toward heaven and swear an oath to live as free and equal citizens.

Moved to tears by the spectacle, the traveller says to the Genius:

Now let me live, for I can hope.

==== The Conspiracy of Tyrants ====
The French Revolution sends shockwaves throughout Europe. Peoples waver between the hope of emancipation and the fear of abandoning customs sanctified by centuries of tradition.

Kings, nobles, priests, and other privileged groups immediately recognize that their domination is threatened. They form a vast coalition to "stamp out the fire at its source." The powerful seek to persuade the peoples that any challenge to the established order will bring down divine punishment.

France proclaims its determination by presenting itself "entirely under arms." The Legislator, speaking on behalf of the representatives, sends a message to the neighbouring kingdoms. He invites them to submit their beliefs to public examination: "If you possess the truth, let us see it."

=== The General Assembly of the Nations ===
At France's invitation, envoys from every part of the world gather in a vast amphitheatre. The traveller contemplates this "General Assembly of the Nations" with fascination. He observes the diversity of clothing, physical features, skin colours, and ways of life. These differences arise from historical circumstances and climate, yet all these men possess the same fundamental faculties and belong to a single human species.

The Legislator addresses the assembly. He calls upon the nations to recognize that they all possess the same rights because they have received from nature "the same life and the same organs." Humanity, he declares, ought to form "one society, one great family", governed by "the code of reason."

At first, his speech is greeted with unanimous acclaim. This enthusiasm is soon shattered, however, when the religious leaders intervene, each claiming to possess "the true law" while denouncing all the others as being in error. In order to break this deadlock, the Legislator invites them to defend their respective doctrines before the assembled nations.

==== Religious Contradictions ====
Thousands of banners suddenly appear, revealing a far greater degree of fragmentation than the traveller had imagined. Believing the world to be divided among only a few great religions, he instead discovers an almost infinite multitude of sects.

The Genius proceeds to present the principal religious traditions.

Islam proclaims the unity of God. Yet the Quran, supposedly offering a clear and definitive revelation, requires an endless succession of commentaries, which in turn give rise to schisms and interminable disputes. "This religion, which celebrates a compassionate and merciful God, the creator and common father of all mankind, has become a torch of discord, a cause of murder and war, and for twelve centuries has never ceased to inundate the Earth with blood, spreading devastation and disorder from one end of the Old World to the other."

The Genius then turns to the "worshippers of Jesus", who acknowledge the same God as the Muslims and likewise believe that Adam condemned "the whole human race by eating an apple." Christians proclaim the unity of God while dividing Him into three persons. The Father begot Jesus, who was born of a Virgin. Consubstantial with the Father, Christ is both God and man; he died and rose again. "The Muslims, unable to comprehend these mysteries, dismiss them as madness and reject them as the fantasies of diseased minds; hence arise implacable hatreds."

Christianity itself is divided into countless sects. (Note: Their "quarrels are all the more obstinate and violent because the objects on which they are founded, being inaccessible to the senses, leave each person's opinions dependent solely upon caprice and will.") The Genius enumerates these various denominations, "hating one another in the name of a God of peace, each reserving heaven exclusively for itself within a religion of universal charity, consigning one another to eternal torments in the next world, while realizing in this one the very hell which their imaginations place in the other."

Judaism, the Genius explains, has temporarily escaped such internal divisions only because the Jewish people are dispersed. Once reunited, however, the Jews will resume the doctrinal disputes that once divided them: "This people, whose perfection consists in cutting away a small piece of flesh; this atom among nations, this tiny wave in the ocean of peoples, imagining that God created the universe for them alone, will once again diminish by half, through schism, the already slight weight they place in the balance of the world."

The same, he says, is true of the "children of Zoroaster, the obscure remnants of peoples once so powerful, now persecuted like the Jews." Once reunited, the Zoroastrians "will divide into sects all the more numerous because, during their dispersion, individual families will have adopted the customs and opinions of foreign nations."

The Genius next mocks the Hindus, who "purify themselves with cow dung and urine, yet believe themselves defiled by the touch of another human being." They worship a multitude of gods whom the Brahmins, "with a few words, imprison within an idol or a jar, in order to sell their favours at will."

Buddhists, Jains, Shintoists, Taoists, Confucians, Siberian shamans, and African magicians have likewise planted their banners in the arena. "I should never finish, says the Genius, were I to describe all the different systems of belief that continue to divide mankind.

The debate now begins. The first argument advanced is that of revelation. Each religion claims to derive directly from God. The Legislator dismisses this appeal, since it cannot advance the discussion.

The representatives of the various religions then recount the miracles performed by their prophets and saints. Once again the argument proves inconclusive: if every religion possesses its own miracles while dismissing those of others as either illusions or the work of demons, no miracle can constitute objective proof.

The third argument is that of martyrdom. Believers maintain that the willingness to sacrifice one's life for a religion demonstrates its truth. The Legislator replies that such sacrifices prove only the sincerity of believers, not the truth of their doctrines.

The discussion then turns to the content of religious teachings. An imam first presents the revelation of the Quran, its commandments, prohibitions, and the rewards promised in paradise. His discourse immediately provokes objections from the assembly, which criticizes both the intrusive nature of this religion and its internal inconsistencies. Moreover, disputes between Sunnis and Shi'ites quickly emerge, showing that a religion claiming to possess a single truth is itself incapable of preserving unity.

The next speaker is a Christian theologian, who expounds the doctrines of Creation, original sin, the Incarnation, the Redemption, and the Sacraments. The assembly remains unconvinced, particularly by the doctrines of the Trinity, Christ's dual nature, and humanity's collective responsibility for original sin. Nor do the various Christian denominations agree among themselves, immediately quarrelling over the Eucharist, grace, the authority of the Pope, and indulgences. Once again, internal divisions undermine every claim to unanimity.

A rabbi then rises to challenge the Christian interpretation of the Bible. He argues that the followers of Jesus have distorted the true meaning of Scripture and that Christianity is nothing more than a late and erroneous reinterpretation of Judaism.

A Zoroastrian high priest follows, asserting that many of the fundamental elements of the Abrahamic religions – moral dualism, the immortality of the soul, the Last Judgment, angels and demons, and the resurrection of the dead – were borrowed from Zoroastrianism. Brahmins, in turn, claim an even greater antiquity and present the doctrines of Hinduism. Lamas respond by accusing the Brahmins of having corrupted an even older teaching before expounding the life and doctrine of Gautama Buddha.

As the dispute reaches its height, a group of Chinese shamans and Thai bonzes enters the scene, claiming to be able to reconcile everyone. Yet the religion of nature that they advocate is immediately denounced by the theologians as materialistic and atheistic. The discussion degenerates into an endless controversy over the nature of God, the soul, and immaterial realities, each doctrine resting upon concepts that cannot be demonstrated by experience.

The Legislator finally brings the debate to a close. The true question, he declares, is no longer which religion is true, but how all these ideas originated, and how they have been transmitted and transformed over the course of history.

==== The Origin of Religions ====
A new group of men enters the arena. They come from different religious communities but carry no banners of their own. One of these "minds freed from prejudice" rises to speak.

Religious beliefs, he declares, are transmitted from generation to generation through the education of children, authority, and habit, yet they cannot withstand critical examination. Religions are constructions of the human mind, which acquires its ideas only through the senses and through experience accumulated over successive generations. Each religion bears the imprint of particular historical circumstances: it arose at a specific time and in a specific place. It is therefore possible to trace the genealogy of religions, which have influenced one another and all derive from a common source.

Rituals, he explains, require a complex social organization, while metaphysics presupposes a language sufficiently developed to express abstract ideas – capacities that primitive humanity did not yet possess. Early humans merely observed that the sun gives warmth, fire burns, water drowns, wind overturns, and thunder inspires fear. Their helplessness before nature led them to imagine a superior power.

Natural phenomena sometimes bestowed benefits and sometimes inflicted suffering. Human beings therefore developed feelings of hope and fear toward them. Since they occasionally succeeded in persuading their fellow men through supplication or gifts, they imagined that the powers of nature could likewise be influenced.

Once mankind became agricultural, calendars were established to regulate cultivation. Living henceforth in hierarchical societies, people projected their political organization onto the heavens. The sun became the king, the moon the queen, the planets ministers or messengers, and the stars an army of subordinate divinities. Planetary conjunctions were transformed into marriages, adulteries, and incestuous unions among the gods.

To identify the stars, people assigned them the names of animals, plants, and objects associated with the seasons. These names originally served only as mnemonic devices. In time, however, their astronomical meaning was forgotten, and symbols came to be mistaken for realities. Human beings began to worship animals, plants, and objects, believing them to embody celestial powers. Metaphorical narratives were eventually interpreted literally. Osiris, Hercules, and Bacchus came to be regarded as historical figures.

Knowledge of nature was monopolized by a priestly caste that jealously guarded its secrets. Claiming magical powers and exploiting popular credulity, the priests became the intermediaries of the gods and the advisers of princes. They asserted control over access to salvation and claimed the authority to dispense rewards and punishments.

The speaker then addresses the various religious leaders assembled before the General Assembly of the Nations. Turning at length to the Christians, whom he describes as worshippers of a Lamb of God born from the celestial Virgin at the winter solstice, slain and enclosed within a dark tomb before rising again in the spring, he declares that Christianity "is nothing more than the worship of the sun." Through his sacrifice, Jesus delivered the world from evil, "that is to say, from the constellation of the Serpent, that great serpent, mother of winter and emblem of the Ahriman or Satan of the Persians." Christ, he argues, is not a historical person but a personification of the sun – a myth derived from older Eastern traditions.

The Christians erupt in anger, but the Muslims, lamas, and Brahmins call them to order, allowing the speaker to conclude:

Now, if you summarize the entire history of the religious spirit, you will see that in its origin it had no author but the sensations and needs of mankind; that the idea of God took as its type and model only the physical powers, the material beings that act either for good or for evil. [...] You will see that the whole history of the religious spirit is nothing but the history of the uncertainties of the human mind, which, placed in a world it does not understand, nevertheless seeks to solve its mystery [...], invents chimeras composed of incompatible beings, and, forever dreaming of wisdom and happiness, loses itself in a labyrinth of sufferings and follies.

The theologians dismiss the demonstration as nothing more than historical conjecture. Even if this reconstruction were true, they argue, it would be better to suppress it, since erroneous beliefs are indispensable instruments for governing mankind.

The floor then passes to a group of ordinary men. They challenge the authority of the religious leaders. Why, they ask, would God entrust truth only to a privileged few charged with transmitting it to everyone else? They declare that they see no practical value in endless speculation concerning the origin of the world, creation, revelation, or the antiquity of religions. None of these questions does anything to improve the human condition.

The discussion turns to the practical effects of religion upon human conduct. Each faith claims the superiority of its moral teaching. Muslims present Islam as a religion of justice, resignation, and simplicity. Christians reply by extolling the virtues of the Gospels. They attribute to Christianity the abolition of human sacrifice, the softening of manners, the equality of all people before God, charity, and forgiveness.

The Muslims answer by pointing to the contradiction between Christian ideals and the history of the Church. The Crusades, the persecution of heretics, the Wars of Religion, the colonization of the Americas, and the Atlantic slave trade undermine Christianity's moral pretensions. Brahmins, rabbis, bonzes, and shamans likewise denounce the intolerance, hypocrisy, and lust for domination displayed by Christian missionaries.

Each religion condemns the abuses of the others without realizing that it is describing its own institutions. All priests live from the labour of others through gifts, offerings, or taxes; all preserve mystery in order to maintain a monopoly on knowledge; all adapt their doctrines to changing circumstances in order to increase their power.

Confronted before the assembly, the priests acknowledge their own human weaknesses but shift the blame onto popular credulity. The kings do the same, insisting that they became despots only because the peoples themselves willingly accepted oppression.

==== "The Religion of Evidence and Truth" ====
After the Assembly of the Nations has identified the origins of religious error, the Legislator proposes a method for overcoming it. He begins by exposing the absurdity of religious intolerance. If God intended to save only one religion, then only one sect within that religion, and finally only a handful of believers within that sect, then almost the whole of humanity would be condemned. Invited to agree upon the identity of this tiny number of the elect, the assembled peoples instead discover a common brotherhood in the face of death.

The Legislator then puts a series of questions to the assembly. All give the same answers when the questions concern facts directly accessible to experience: the shape of the sun, the density of gold, the hardness of iron, or the taste of sugar. He then asks:

Is there a chasm at the centre of the Earth, and are there inhabitants on the Moon?

This question immediately divides the assembly:

Some answered yes, others no; some declared it probable; others maintained that the question was idle and absurd; while others insisted that it was worth knowing. Thus universal disagreement prevailed.

The Legislator observes that as soon as questions concern realities that cannot be verified, answers become contradictory. Agreement arises from sense experience, whereas disagreement springs from speculation, passion, prejudice, and private interest.

Since theological questions cannot be decided by experience, he continues, they ought to produce no effects in the civil order. Religious opinions should belong exclusively to the realm of individual conscience and must not influence the laws governing society.

The Assembly of the Nations unanimously endorses this principle. It asks the Legislator to establish a universal code:

Be the legislator of the whole human race. [...] Show us the line that separates the world of chimeras from that of realities, and teach us, after so many religions and so many errors, the religion of evidence and truth!

== Reception in the English-speaking world ==
The Ruins enjoyed immense popularity for several decades, at least until the end of the Georgian era. Volney became the best-known French revolutionary writer in Great Britain and in the United States. His influence on the radical culture during this period was surpassed only by that of Thomas Paine. Such was his fame that Marilyn Butler described him as "the Foucault of his day."

An English version was published in London as early as 1792. The translator, James Marshall, was a friend of the philosopher William Godwin, while the publisher was Joseph Johnson (Note: During the 1790s Johnson published much of the English literature sympathetic to the French Revolution, including Thomas Paine's Rights of Man and The Age of Reason.) Reprinted four times in four years, the work circulated among members of the London Corresponding Society, followers of the agrarian socialist Thomas Spence and the "infidel societies" that flourished in London and the provinces.

In 1795, Volney left France for the United States, where he renewed his acquaintance with Thomas Jefferson – whom he had first met while Jefferson was serving as ambassador to France (Note: The two men met in 1785 among the philosophical circles surrounding the salon of Madame Helvétius. They shared a remarkably wide range of interests, including politics, philology, botany, geology, anthropology, the history of religions, and the natural sciences. Their correspondence was conducted in French by Volney and in English by Jefferson. During Volney's stay in the United States between 1795 and 1798, he was twice received at Monticello. Jefferson provided him with letters of introduction for his travels and supplied him with information on American agriculture.) – and was received by George Washington. In July 1796, The Vermont Gazette printed The New Age, the central chapter of The Ruins, which was subsequently circulated as a pamphlet. In December, The Polar Star, a newspaper published in Boston, also printed extracts from the work.

The English chemist Joseph Priestley, who had by then settled in Philadelphia, published in 1797 Observations on the Increase of Infidelity. To Which Are Added, Animadversions on the Writings of Several Modern Unbelievers, and Especially the Ruins of Mr. Volney. In it, he refuted the Christ myth theory and accused the French philosopher of corrupting the young. (Note: Priestley, a persecuted Unitarian in England, had already referred to Volney in his Letters Addressed to the Philosophers and Politicians of France (Philadelphia, 1795). After Volney replied to his criticisms in 1797, Priestley published further letters the same year attacking The Ruins. Alexander Cook also cites Anglican responses, including those of the Reverend David Simpson (An Essay on the Authenticity of the New Testament, Designed as an Answer to Evanson's Dissonance and Volney's Ruins, Macclesfield, 1793), the Irish clergyman Peter Roberts (Christianity Vindicated, in a Series of Letters, Addressed to Mr. Volney, in Answer to His Book Called Ruins, or a Survey of the Revolution of Empires, 1800), and the deacon William Cockburn (Remarks on a Publication of M. Volney Called "The Ruins", Cambridge, 1800).)

Volney was soon embraced by American freethinkers. Elihu Palmer, founder of the "Deistical Society of New York", wrote in Principles of Nature (1801):

Of all the book that ever were published, Volney's Ruins is pre-eminently entitled to the appelation of Holy Writ, and ought to be appointed to be read in churches — not by His Majesty's special command, but with the universal consent and approbation of all those who love nature, truth, and human happiness.

=== Thomas Jefferson's Translation ===
One year after Volney left the United States, James Lyon published a translation of The Ruins in Philadelphia, without the author's permission. Dissatisfied with the two existing English versions, Volney supervised the preparation of a new translation. Thomas Jefferson, who had been elected President of the United States in 1800, personally translated the first nineteen chapters, while the diplomat Joel Barlow completed the remaining five.

Jefferson considered himself a Christian and rejected the Christ myth theory advanced at the end of The Ruins. At his own request, his involvement in the translation remained secret. Publicly associating his name with the project would have been politically disastrous, as the Federalist Party already accused him of atheism and denounced his sympathies for the French Revolution. (Note: As Nathalie Caron notes, Jefferson temporarily suspended his correspondence with Volney in 1798, when the political climate had become particularly hostile to the French, in order to avoid providing further ammunition to Federalist critics.) He even insisted that his manuscript be burned once it had served its purpose.

The translation was published in Paris in 1802. The following year, about one thousand copies crossed the Atlantic, some of them intended for James Madison, Aaron Burr, and other prominent Americans. In gratitude for Jefferson's assistance, Volney presented him with a model of the Great Pyramid of Giza, which Jefferson displayed at his residence in Monticello.

This translation became the standard English version of Volney's book. Of the fifteen American editions published during the nineteenth century, thirteen reproduced the Jefferson–Barlow translation, although Thomas Jefferson's role remained unknown for more than a century, until it was discovered by Gilbert Chinard.

Abraham Lincoln read The Ruins during the 1830s, while Walt Whitman, whose father admired Volney, was, in his own words, "raised" on the book.

=== Volney and English Romanticism ===
In Frankenstein; or, The Modern Prometheus (1818) by Mary Shelley, the abandoned Creature, after leaving Victor Frankenstein's laboratory, takes refuge in the cottage of a French family. In the evenings, by the fireside, the family's son, Felix, reads The Ruins aloud to Safie, his Arab fiancée, as part of her French lessons. Secretly listening to them, Frankenstein's monster derives from Volney's book his understanding of human history, political institutions, and religious beliefs. (Note: The Creature discovers three other books that complete his education: Paradise Lost by John Milton, a volume of Parallel Lives by Plutarch, and The Sorrows of Young Werther by Johann Wolfgang von Goethe.)

Volney's influence is also apparent in the works of the poet Percy Bysshe Shelley, Mary Shelley's husband, particularly in Queen Mab (1813), Alastor, or The Spirit of Solitude (1816), The Revolt of Islam (1818), and Prometheus Unbound (1820).

Scholars have also identified echoes of The Ruins in works by Lord Byron, William Blake Thomas Moore and Thomas Love Peacock.

=== Influence on Radical Movements ===
Following the end of the Napoleonic Wars, (Note: As Alexander Cook observes, once the patriotic fervour of the war years had subsided, there were increasing signs among English radicals of a willingness to display familiarity with French texts, reflecting growing frustration with the use of patriotism to silence political dissent. Some radicals, such as Henry Hunt, remained hostile to foreign influence on British political culture and continued to distrust French theories of natural rights, instead emphasizing Britain's Protestant identity and constitutional liberties.) Volney experienced a revival of popularity in England. In 1820, the year of his death, the London bookseller Thomas Tegg claimed to have sold 10,000 copies of The Ruins. Between 1819 and 1835, the work appeared in at least eight editions, in addition to the many extracts published in newspapers and serialized publications. Thomas Jonathan Wooler, for example, quoted it extensively in his newspaper The Black Dwarf throughout the post-war period.

Whereas Volney is generally regarded in France as a moderate liberal, British readers, largely unfamiliar with the political divisions that emerged after the Reign of Terror, viewed him as a leading advocate of popular sovereignty. As E. P. Thompson. and later Peter Linebaugh and Marcus Rediker have shown, he was especially widely read among those excluded from political life, including impoverished workers and religious dissenters.

The passage from The Ruins that most deeply moved English readers, and which was most frequently reprinted in newspapers and circulated as a pamphlet, was the central chapter, The New Age, which prophesied that the people, once conscious of their own strength, would rise against the parasitic "idle classes", proclaim their independence, and bring oppression to an end. (Note: This chapter of The Ruins was published in London in 1830 under the title A Revolution in England. It was still being quoted at a Chartist banquet in 1838 (Northern Star, 17 November 1838, p. 5).) It has been suggested that Volney may have inspired William Benbow's proposal for a general strike in 1832.

Members of the clergy believed that Volney's subversive influence stemmed from the nature of his readership. They deplored the circulation of The Ruins among the "ignorant", the "young", the "impressionable", and the "lower orders". (Note: A satire directed at Volney's followers mocked a belief that "anticipated, under British journeymen and mechanicks, the triumph of a project, which lamentably failed under French statesmen and philosophers".) William Hails argued that the book deliberately deceived weak minds through a dangerous use of literary artifice. The Reverend Thomas Broughton likewise complained that the French were infiltrating English culture with pamphlets "published and sold in twopennies numbers, to undermine Christianity and the British Constitution". In his view, Volney was "the champion of the class".

The freethinker Richard Carlile declared that the book had "made more deists and atheists than all the other anti-Christian writings that have circulated in this country". (Note: The culture of "improvement" and "self-government", which permeated radical politics during this period, was highly compatible with Volney's moral philosophy. Reading itself was regarded as an essential means of bringing about social change. This emphasis on self-education was especially pronounced within Richard Carlile's Zetetic movement, whose name derives from the Greek verb meaning "to seek".) Carlile, owner of London's Blackfriars Rotunda, organized gatherings of freethinkers there, during which extracts from The Ruins were read aloud by Robert Taylor, nicknamed the "Devil's Chaplain". At their height in the early 1830s, the Sunday meetings of the Rotunda radicals attracted as many as 4,000 people.

Volney's influence on the British radical movement extended into the early Victorian era. Chartists such as James Watson, Feargus O'Connor, and George Julian Harney identified with his ideas.

During the second half of the nineteenth century, new editions of The Ruins continued to appear, albeit at a slower pace. In the 1880s and 1890s, the book was distributed by The Freethought Publishing Company of Annie Besant and Charles Bradlaugh.

== Reception in Europe ==
=== France ===
The Ruins remained one of France's greatest publishing successes for approximately half a century, (Note: According to estimates based on the Bibliographie de la France, published annually from 1811 onward, only Fénelon's The Adventures of Telemachus and the works of Voltaire and Jean-Jacques Rousseau consistently ranked above The Ruins between 1811 and 1850 among books containing substantial political or religious criticism. Among works published during the French Revolution, only Bernardin de Saint-Pierre's novel Paul et Virginie enjoyed greater popularity during the same period. Between 1816 and 1830, The Ruins never fell below twenty-sixth place in the French bestseller rankings. See M. Lyon, "Les best-sellers", in H. J. Martin and R. Chartier (eds.), Histoire de l'édition française, 4 vols., Paris: Promodis, 1983–1986, vol. III, pp. 369–379.) before falling into relative obscurity from the mid-nineteenth century onward.

Many refutations were published by clergymen. Volney, suspected of atheism and known for having questioned the historicity of Jesus, was, for example, cited in the Masonic conspiracy theories of the French Revolution advanced by Jacques-François Lefranc and Augustin Barruel.

=== During Volney's lifetime ===
In the weeks following its publication, extracts from The Ruins were reproduced in newspapers. Chamfort, writing in the Mercure de France, praised "the profound and vigorous philosophy that inspired this excellent work.". In the Journal de Paris, the deputy Garat described the book as one of "the most distinguished works to have appeared since the Revolution", adding that "several chapters would have seemed bold only three or four years earlier."

After the dissolution of the National Constituent Assembly, Volney settled in Corsica, where he became acquainted with Napoleon – then a young lieutenant. Napoleon's famous address before the Pyramids of Giza – "Soldiers, from the summit of these pyramids forty centuries look down upon you!" – echoes a passage from the Genius's speech at the beginning of The Ruins: "And you, evidences of twenty centuries, holy temples! venerable tombs!"

During the Reign of Terror, before his imprisonment, Volney published The Natural Law, or the Catechism of the French Citizen. The work was presented as a companion volume to The Ruins, which concludes with the announcement of a code of laws intended for all humanity. (Note: Among works published during the same period, Anacharsis Cloots's Appel au genre humain (1793) and Nicolas de Condorcet's Sketch for a Historical Picture of the Progress of the Human Mind (1794) likewise presented the revolutionary moment as an opportunity for the emancipation of all humankind.) This universal ambition disappeared from the title because of the war opposing the French First Republic to the other European powers.

In 1799, The Ruins, together with The Natural Law as an appendix, was republished by the booksellers Dugour and Durant in Paris.

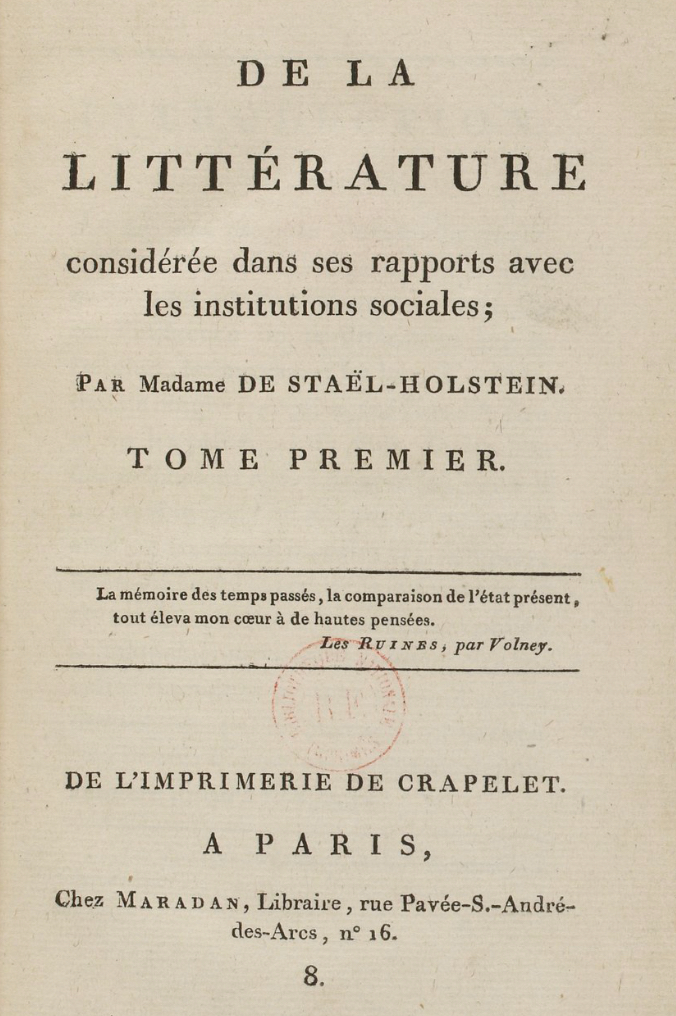
Madame de Staël borrowed an epigraph from The Ruins for the title page of her essay De la littérature (1800).

An entire generation read The Ruins. Its reflections on the history of civilizations and the origin of religions profoundly influenced Antoine Fabre d'Olivet, Nicolas de Bonneville, Maine de Biran, and Claude Fauriel. The solitary traveller's meditation also inspired the first French Romantic writers, (Note: The book's success undoubtedly helped establish this motif as one of the defining themes of early Romantic sensibility. Volney's influence should not, however, be overstated, since his work formed part of a broader aesthetic and philosophical movement that had emerged during the decades preceding the French Revolution.) including Étienne Pivert de Senancour and François-René de Chateaubriand, who paid tribute to Volney in his Itinerary from Paris to Jerusalem.

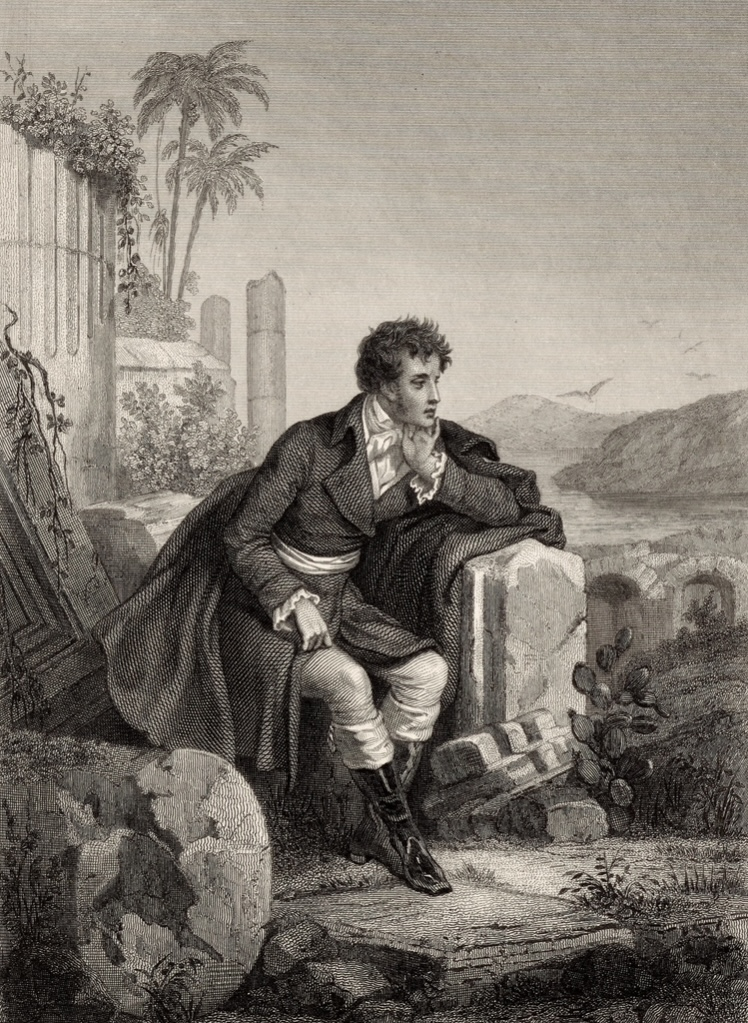
Chateaubriand among the ruins of Carthage (engraving after a drawing by Gustave Staal).

While exiled in London during the Reign of Terror, the young Chateaubriand initially expressed hostility toward Christianity in his Essay on Revolutions, (Note: "Skillful men, perceiving this tendency of human nature toward superstition, took advantage of it. Priestly sects arose whose interest lay in thickening the veil of Error. ... The priests of Persia and Egypt closely resembled our own. Their minds were equally composed of fanaticism and indifference." Jean Gaulmier regarded this passage as evidence of the influence of Volney's The Ruins, which enjoyed considerable success in London during Chateaubriand's exile.) before returning to the Catholic faith after the death of his mother. In 1802, he published The Genius of Christianity, the work of apologetics that established his literary reputation.

Writing about Condorcet's annotated edition of Blaise Pascal's Pensées, Chateaubriand observed: "One seems to behold the ruins of Palmyra, those magnificent remnants of genius and time, where the Arab of the desert has built his miserable hut." In the opening chapter of The Ruins, Volney had described Palmyra as inhabited by "some poor Arabian peasants, who had built their hutts on the area of the temple".

The influence of The Ruins is particularly evident in this passage from René, which concludes The Genius of Christianity: "At times the same sun that had witnessed the founding of those cities set majestically before my eyes upon their ruins; at others the moon, rising in a cloudless sky between two half-broken funerary urns, revealed to me the pale tombs. Often, beneath the rays of that star which nourishes reverie, I imagined I saw the Genius of Memory seated pensively at my side."

Volney, who had quarrelled with Napoleon Bonaparte over the Concordat of 1801, despised the fideism of the "author promoted" by the regime. In his later works, he made several pointed remarks directed at Chateaubriand. The two writers later served together in the Chamber of Peers under Louis XVIII.

=== After his death ===
Victor Hugo wrote an obituary for his journal Le Conservateur littéraire. (Note: Published in the thirteenth issue. Jean Gaulmier quoted a passage from it, but it has not been located in the digitized editions. Paul Berret noted that Hugo had studied philosophy at the Lycée Louis-le-Grand under Maugras, a disciple of the Idéologues.) Volney's collected works were published in 1822 by the Bossange brothers (the sons of Martin Bossange), just after The Ruins was placed on the Index Librorum Prohibitorum by the Catholic Church. At the beginning of the reign of Charles X of France, the authorities officially prohibited the book's circulation and sale. Copies nevertheless found their way clandestinely into schools. (Note: Charles-Augustin Sainte-Beuve later recalled that, in his youth, "when every effort was being made to combat the political ascendancy of a religious party, these already forgotten books were brought back into circulation, multiplied in new editions, and enjoyed a popularity that was both artificial and short-lived.")

The principal criticisms directed against Volney concerned his materialist explanation of religious belief and his moral philosophy, founded upon "self-love", which represented the culmination of the sensualism of the Enlightenment. (Note: The deist Jacques-Henri Bernardin de Saint-Pierre, together with Protestant thinkers such as Germaine de Staël and Benjamin Constant, maintained that a morality grounded in self-interest could never provide an adequate foundation for either private or political virtue.) The journal Thémis accused him of "deifying selfishness". In 1828, philosopher Jean-Philibert Damiron wrote: "His catechism prevails almost everywhere that the Church's catechism no longer holds sway. It is the catechism of the greater part of those indifferent to religion; in that sense, it has already become the catechism of the majority." (Note: A pupil of Victor Cousin – the first French academic to teach the philosophy of Immanuel Kant – Damiron defended a version of the categorical imperative, opposing Volney's "pettily rational" philosophy with a transcendental conception of duty. In his view, "if the principles of morality are merely physical principles, all human dignity is annihilated.")

The message of The Ruins resonated with the political aspirations of the bourgeoisie during the reign of the last Bourbon kings. It notably influenced Le Globe, "the journal of the doctrine of Saint-Simon."

Under the July Monarchy, Volney's writings remained a familiar cultural reference. They are mentioned, for example, in a letter from Honoré de Balzac to Ewelina Hańska written in 1834. (Note: "I very nearly got myself devoured for saying that, strictly speaking, the form of the Words of a Believer was nothing but nonsense, since Volney and Byron had already employed it..." (letter of 20 August 1834). François Duine notes that Félicité de Lamennais, the author of Words of a Believer, had indeed read Volney in his youth (La Mennais : sa vie, ses idées, ses ouvrages, d'après les sources imprimées et les documents inédits, 1922, pp. 21, 200).) In Isis (1845), Gérard de Nerval referred to "the magnificent prelude of Volney's Ruins". (Note: "I seated myself upon a stone, contemplating those two heavenly bodies which had long been worshipped in this temple under the names of Osiris and Isis, beneath mystical attributes alluding to their various phases, and I found myself overcome by a profound emotion. A child of a skeptical rather than unbelieving age, wavering between two opposing educations – that of the Revolution, which denied everything, and that of the social reaction, which sought to restore the whole body of Christian beliefs – was I now to be led to believe everything, just as our philosopher fathers had been led to deny everything? I thought of that magnificent prelude to Volney's The Ruins, in which the Genius of the Past appears amid the ruins of Palmyra, drawing from such lofty inspiration only the power to destroy, piece by piece, the entire body of humanity's religious traditions. Thus, beneath the efforts of modern reason, Christ himself, the last of the revealers, who in the name of a higher reason had once emptied the heavens, likewise perished. O Nature! O eternal Mother! Was this truly the destiny reserved for the last of your celestial sons? Have mortals come to reject all hope and all wonder, and, lifting your sacred veil, O goddess of Sais, has the boldest of your initiates found himself face to face with the image of Death? If the successive downfall of beliefs leads to such a result, would it not be more comforting to fall into the opposite excess and seek once more the illusions of the past?")

Jean Gaulmier traced the influence of The Ruins into the 1850s, finding echoes of it in poems by Leconte de Lisle Charles Baudelaire and Victor Hugo.

Half a century after the French Revolution, however, the decline of the rationalist legacy of the Enlightenment, the triumph of Romantic sensibility, the Christian revival, and the rise of spiritualist philosophy had relegated The Ruins, both intellectually and stylistically, (Note: The writers of the French Revolution, more concerned with philosophical demonstration and civic eloquence than with literary style, had fallen out of fashion in favor of a less declamatory, more intimate, and more flexible prose. Jean Gaulmier wrote: "Volney clearly belongs to an age that has lost the taste for majestic compositions. With a subject capable of captivating the imagination and a conception of the world of undeniable breadth, Volney failed to construct a balanced whole. His book appears as a succession of passages, some of them brilliant and all of them interesting, rather than as a firmly structured discourse. ... He was not a sufficiently great artist to forge the style that would have suited his thought exactly. Hence the awkwardness that leads him into bombast whenever he seeks grandeur, and into dryness whenever he strives for precision. ... Volney's imagination is too limited to depict, with the magnificence required, the scenes suggested by his intellect.") reducing it to the status of a relic of a bygone age.

In 1853, Sainte-Beuve devoted two of his Monday Talks to Volney, observing that he was by then scarcely read anymore. The "kind of social offence" of which Volney had been guilty explained why his "gloomy books" were destined to fall into oblivion. (Note: Referring to Volney's theory of the astronomical origin of religions, Sainte-Beuve asked: "How can he know this? And how can such confidence be reconciled with such disbelief?" In his view, Volney anticipated "the industrial society of the future" through his irreverence toward the sacred and his "mechanical" cast of mind, prone to excessive generalization: "Even when Volney reaches the right line, he always exaggerates by digging too deeply or stripping away everything that accompanies it.") Sainte-Beuve was equally severe regarding Volney's literary style, describing it as "tedious" and "pindaric": "It is dull, weary, pompous, monotonous, sonorous and muffled at the same time. Morally, how much more truth – even for the philosopher – there is in two words of Pascal, where the cry of the heart bursts forth! And if it is a question of art, how much more light and melancholy reflection there is in a few pages of Chateaubriand!"

This disappearance from the collective memory can also be observed in political thought. The anarchist Pierre-Joseph Proudhon, when he met in 1853 with Victor de Persigny (Minister of the Interior under Napoleon III), declared: "Volney, Monsieur le Ministre, is my master. ... Do you wish to make me a senator? I accept." Yet this leading figure of 1789, once a hero of the republican opposition during the Bourbon Restoration, was gradually distanced by subsequent generations.

During the twentieth century, historians frequently portrayed Volney as a moderate bourgeois. Gaston Martin wrote, for example, that Volney "belonged quite precisely to that upper-middle-class milieu which saw in the convocation of the Estates General of 1789 the opportunity to acquire political influence commensurate with its social power and abilities, but not the complete overthrow of an economic order from which it greatly benefited" (1934). For Georges Gusdorf, he embodied the "retreat in the face of the irruption of the masses onto the stage of history" (1978). (Note: Other examples include: "Volney represents the bourgeois leadership of the revolutionary movement against its more popular tendencies" (R. Barny, 1987), and "Volney reveals the narrow-mindedness of the bourgeois Enlightenment in relation to historical phenomena of collective and popular origin" (Henry Deneys, 1991).)

=== Germany ===
The Ruins was translated in early 1792 by Georg Forster and Meta Forkel-Liebeskind. In Leipzig, the text was seized at the publisher's premises before it could be offered for sale. Forster nevertheless succeeded in rescuing a number of copies from the authorities, and Die Ruinen soon began to circulate. (Note: The Natural Law (Katechismus des französischen Bürgers) was also translated by Ludwig Ferdinand Huber and inspired Johann Gottfried Seume's Kurzes Pflichten und Sittenbuch für Landleute ("Short Manual of Duties and Morals for Country People").) In 1794, the work was banned in Berlin, "under penalty of a fine of one hundred ducats for every copy."

==== Hegel and Volney ====
The opening meditation of The Ruins was translated as early as January 1792 in the first issue of Minerva, (Note: Minerva also published Volney's letter to the Russian Empress Catherine the Great, in which he regretted her support for the army of the French émigré princes then assembling in the Rhineland.) the journal edited by Johann Wilhelm von Archenholz.

Several indications suggest that the young Hegel had read this excerpt, and probably the entire work. (Note: In 1792, Hegel was living in Tübingen within a circle of friends who closely followed contemporary political and cultural events. He greatly admired Forster, the translator of Volney's book, and regularly read Minerva. The German translation of the meditation employed the expression die Vergänglichkeit menschlicher Dinge ("the transience of human affairs"), which Hegel later reused several times. He also employed not only the word Trümmern ("ruins"), but also Ruinen, the title chosen by Archenholz. According to Jacques D'Hondt, these parallels are too numerous to be dismissed as mere coincidence. D'Hondt also notes that Volney's Travels through Egypt and Syria was translated into German at Jena in 1800 by Hegel's friend Heinrich Eberhard Gottlob Paulus.) Jacques D'Hondt devoted a study to the echoes of Volney's thought in the philosophy of Hegel.

In his Lectures on the Philosophy of World History, Hegel described vanished civilizations in the following terms: "The negative aspect of the idea of change moves us to sadness. It oppresses us to think that the richest forms and the finest manifestations of life must perish in history, and that we walk amidst the ruins of excellence. History cuts us off from the finest and noblest of our interests: the passions have destroyed them, for they are transient. It seems that all must perish and that nothing endures. Every traveller has experienced this melancholy. (Note: Hegel's travels never took him beyond the boundaries of Central and Western Europe.) Who has stood among the ruins of Carthage, Palmyra, Persepolis or Rome without being moved to reflect on the transience of empires and men, to mourn the loss of the rich and vigorous life of bygone ages? It is not a sorrow like that which we experience at the graves of those dear to us, when we lament our personal losses and the transience of our own aspirations; it is rather a disinterested sorrow at the downfall of the brilliant cultures of the past."

According to Hegel, "we can can endure it and strengthen ourselves against it only by thinking that this is the way it had to be—it is fate; nothing can be done. And at last, out of the boredom with which this sorrowful reflection threatens us, we draw back into the vitality of the present, into our aims and interests of the moment; we retreat, in short, into the selfishness that stands on the quiet shore and thence enjoys in safety the distant spectacle of wreckage and confusion."

Hegel's conception of history differed from Volney's. The French believed in a natural law that sanctioned the errors committed by human beings. For Hegel, empires did not disappear merely because they had committed faults: their collapse made possible the emergence of higher historical forms. Extinct civilizations lived on in more advanced ones, built upon their inheritance.

Nevertheless, Hegel did not share Volney's revolutionary optimism, which contrasted a dark vision of the past with an enlightened present and a radiant future. For Volney, ruins were the punishment inflicted upon despotism; they symbolized a tragic and condemnable history.

Hegel's theodicy, grounded in the dialectical movement of the World Spirit (Weltgeist), sought to reconcile humanity with its own history. Yet he conceded that certain historical collapses remain incomprehensible because, having contributed nothing to human progress, they cannot be regarded as a necessary evil. (Note: "Without rhetorical exaggeration one may enumerate all the misfortunes that have befallen the noblest nations and polities, as well as the finest examples of private virtue, or at least of innocence, and thus intensify our emotions to the deepest and most hopeless grief, a grief which no reconciliatory result can alleviate. ... In world history there have been several great periods of development which have run their course without apparently leaving any continuing result; indeed, the whole enormous gains of culture have been destroyed, and mankind has had to begin again from the beginning, with the pitiful remnants of those treasures saved, and after renewed, immense expenditures of time, effort, crime, and suffering, to attain once more one of the stages of civilization which had long since been reached." Hegel regarded Persia and Egypt as examples of regions that never recovered their former splendour. Unlike Volney, however, he refused to contemplate the possibility that European civilization itself might one day fall into ruins.)

Hegel never cited Volney in his Lectures on the Philosophy of World History. Throughout his entire corpus, he mentioned him only once, in passing, in his Lectures on the Philosophy of Religion, where he criticized Volney for proposing an etymological connection between Christ and Krishna – a criticism that demonstrates he had read him closely. Ironically, in the same lecture, Hegel himself advanced the equally dubious analogy between Phoenicia and the phoenix.

Jacques D'Hondt interpreted this silence as follows: "Prudence advised Hegel not to cite this man's name, whether during the revolutionary period or under the Restoration. It was necessary to avoid revealing how much he owed to him."

==== Legacy until World War II ====
By the time Hegel's Lectures on the Philosophy of History appeared, Die Ruinen had already gone through seven editions. Another German translation was published in Leipzig in 1842, followed by a third in Bremen in 1871.

The Christ myth theory – for which Volney was best known – was championed from the 1840s onward by Bruno Bauer. His writings caused a scandal within the Protestant theological faculties and provoked major controversy among the Young Hegelians. The Prussian government deprived Bauer of his right to teach.

Shortly before the First World War, the names of Volney and Charles-François Dupuis were revived by Arthur Drews, who reopened in Germany the debate over the historical existence of Jesus.

In September 1940, at the beginning of the German occupation of France during World War II, the occupying authorities offered Parisian readers Volney's meditation on the fall of empires. André Thérive recounted the episode in L'Envers du Décor: "The only newspaper that sells in the morning is a sheet entitled The Last News of Paris. It is unreadable, moreover, since the articles are obviously written in imported French... The serial publication is worth its weight in molasses: it is simply Volney's Ruins. No doubt someone on the conquerors' general staff is an admirer of this book."

=== Poland ===
Volney was already known in Poland before the publication of The Ruins. Jan Potocki, for example, had read his Travels in Egypt and Syria (1787) as well as his Considerations on the Present War of the Turks, 1788. (Note: The fate of the Ottoman Empire attracted considerable interest in Poland because the Ottomans, long-standing enemies, were viewed by some as potential allies against the Russian Empire. According to Marian Skrzypek, Volney's pamphlet, which emphasized the weakness of the Ottoman state, may have helped dissuade the Polish patriotic party from pursuing a federation with the Sultan. In 1791, a work was published under the pseudonym Apatomachos Wyjasnicki. It cited Volney as "a true guide to understanding the spirit of the Turkish government" and concluded that Turkey offered only "the example of a great ruin", making an alliance with that empire futile. A Polish translation of Travels in Egypt and Syria was published in Kraków in 1803. Among its subscribers were several leading writers of the Polish Enlightenment.)

While the French deputy was completing his new work in Paris, the Great Sejm in Warsaw adopted the Constitution of 3 May 1791, introducing a series of political and social reforms. In The Ruins, however, Volney had written that "in the North ... one sees only degraded serfs, herds of people manipulated by great landowners." In the first revised edition of 1792, he added the following note: "When this was written, the Polish Revolution had not yet taken place. I gladly make amends to the virtuous nobles and the enlightened prince who accomplished it."

The Constitution of 3 May 1791 proved short-lived. The magnates of the Targowica Confederation, backed by Russian military intervention, secured its abolition in the summer of 1792, leading to the Second Partition of Poland. In its campaign against "Jacobin" ideas, the Grodno Sejm established a list of prohibited books that included The Ruins.

The affront Volney had inflicted upon Empress Catherine the Great by returning a medal she had awarded him before the French Revolution made him particularly popular among Polish patriots. The Ruins was translated into Polish in 1794, during the Kościuszko Uprising, possibly by Julian Ursyn Niemcewicz. (Note: At the end of one surviving manuscript appear two lines from Wiosna ("Spring"), an elegy written by Julian Ursyn Niemcewicz after the Second Partition of Poland in 1793. A substantial portion of the poem paraphrases Volney's reflections on ancient civilizations, adding Poland to their number. Niemcewicz later mentioned Volney and his support for the Constitution of 3 May in his memoirs. According to Marian Skrzypek, the participants in the Kościuszko Uprising were the first readers of The Ruins in Poland. He also cites the poet-general Jakub Jasiński, described by Adam Mickiewicz as "that handsome and melancholy young man", who died defending Warsaw against the Russian army, and the painter Aleksander Orłowski, celebrated for his depictions of the uprising.) This edition omitted the concluding discourse on religion in order to avoid offending the clergy. (Note: The priest Karol Surowiecki published a rebuttal entitled Commentary, or an Exposition of the New Apocalypse, Written in French by Mr. Volney, Jacobin-Philosopher and Prophet. He claimed that The Ruins had "already caused enough damage in our Polish Church.")

Following the defeat of the insurgents at the Battle of Maciejowice and the Third Partition of Poland, General Tadeusz Kościuszko and his secretary Julian Ursyn Niemcewicz were imprisoned by Catherine the Great. Released in 1796, they travelled the following year to the United States, where Kościuszko had distinguished himself during the American Revolutionary War. Under the patronage of Thomas Jefferson, they were elected members of the American Philosophical Society, alongside Volney, who was then residing in Philadelphia. In the spring of 1798, Kościuszko was sent to Paris by Jefferson on a diplomatic mission. Volney, who returned to France shortly thereafter, carried with him a letter from the Vice President to Kościuszko.

The Ruins exerted a profound influence on Polish culture in the early nineteenth century, both in poetry and in political literature. (Note: The second part of The Ruins, The Catechism of the French Citizen, was also translated and published under the title Natural Law, or the Physical Principles of Morality (Prawo naturalne czyli Zasady fizyczne moralności). It appeared in Warsaw in 1804 and was reprinted in 1808 and 1819.) The work enjoyed particular popularity at the universities of Kraków and Vilno. The philosopher Stanisław Staszic drew inspiration from it when composing his major work, Rod ludzki ("The Human Race"), published in 1820. (Note: Marian Skrzypek also mentions the priest Ignacy Przybylski (1770–1838), a disciple of Condillac and a member of the Warsaw Society of Friends of Learning. In an unpublished manuscript, Przybylski adopted Volney's theories on the history of religions, omitting only the passages most critical of Christianity.)

The image of the solitary wanderer meditating among ruins inspired several Romantic poets, (Note: Wacław Seweryn Rzewuski, another reader of Volney, likewise visited the ruins of Palmyra and himself became a celebrated figure among the Polish Romantic poets.) foremost among them Adam Mickiewicz in The Crimean Sonnets, particularly The Ruins of the Castle of Balaklava, in which the Pilgrim, standing on the shores of the Black Sea, contemplates the remains of vanished civilizations.

Other examples include Zygmunt Krasiński's Marzyłem wśród ruin ("I Dreamed Among the Ruins") and Jan Paweł Woronicz's Świątynia Sybilli ("The Temple of the Sibyl"), though the latter adopts an opposite Christian and patriotic perspective.

According to Marian Skrzypek, The Ruins continued to be read in Poland into the early twentieth century. He cites, among others, the novelist Stefan Żeromski and Andrzej Niemojewski, a proponent of the Christ myth theory who relied extensively on the arguments advanced by Dupuis and Volney.

=== Spain ===
Seven hundred and fifty copies of The Ruins were clandestinely printed in Madrid in 1797. The Spanish Inquisition prosecuted and convicted the booksellers involved, while the confiscated copies were publicly burned in an auto-da-fé in March 1798.

The Bishop of Salamanca declared that Volney's work was "a tissue of maxims among the most subversive to states, the most contrary to the sovereignty of kings, together with other seductive and detestable doctrines which ought to be erased from the memory of mankind."

The first Spanish translations appeared in Paris and New York in 1817, followed by a London edition in 1818 under the title Meditaciones sobre las Ruinas. Two years later, José Marchena published his own version at Bordeaux, Las Ruinas o meditación sobre las revoluciones de los imperios. Its publication coincided with the Trienio Liberal, which facilitated the circulation of foreign books in Spain until the restoration of absolutism by the French army commanded by the Duke of Angoulême.

Following the inclusion of The Ruins on the Index Librorum Prohibitorum, its prohibition was reaffirmed between 1823 and 1825 by edicts issued by the Archbishop of Toledo, the Bishop of Oviedo, the Archbishop of Valencia, who extended the ban to all of Volney's writings, and the Bishop of Cuenca, who specified that it applied to editions "in every language".

According to a royal decree of 7 January 1826, "a great quantity of obscene, revolutionary, and impious books" continued to be smuggled across the frontier, sometimes concealed under false titles. The Ruins, for example, circulated under the title Life of Saint Michael.

In his Meditaciones (1832), Félix Amat – titular Archbishop of Palmyra – denounced the materialism of "the impious fable forged by Volney". The Ruins also came under attack in conservative newspapers such as La Censura, which described the work as "pestilential".

Only with the return of the Liberals to power during the First Carlist War did two new Spanish editions appear, both published in Paris in 1836 and 1839. The latter, issued by a bookseller in the Palais-Royal, bore the title Las ruinas de Palmira, the designation by which the work has generally been known in Spanish ever since.

A further translation accompanied the Spanish Revolution of 1854, and two additional editions were published following the Revolution of 1868.

Under General Francisco Franco's National Catholic dictatorship, Volney's work once again found a dissident readership. As censorship gradually relaxed, Las ruinas de Palmira was published in a Madrid paperback series in 1969, followed by an edition in Barcelona in 1973. Subsequent reprints (1975, 1978, 1979, 1983, and 1985) testify to a renewed interest in the work during this period.

=== Elsewhere ===
From the 1790s onward, the French edition of The Ruins circulated among educated readers throughout continental Europe, reaching as far as Russia. It was translated into several languages, including Dutch (Amsterdam, 1796), Italian (Milan, 1797), and Portuguese (Lisbon, 1822). (Note: The Ruins was initially prohibited in Portugal. Its translation was authorized only after the Portuguese Liberal Revolution, and it was reprinted four times between 1822 and 1834. Beginning in 1824, the concluding section of the work, considered too critical of Catholicism, was expurgated. Friar Fortunato de São Boaventura recalled that, once the translation was authorized, notices advertising the book were posted on church doors, with the author's name prominently displayed in capital letters. He ranked Volney, together with Rousseau and Voltaire, among the writers most admired by Portuguese Freemasons, who after the Revolution of 1820 had adopted "that infamous deist or atheist as the catechist of the Portuguese nation." The Catechism of the French Citizen was also translated separately in 1820 and reprinted six times over the following twenty years. Boaventura regarded its publication as "one of the greatest crimes against the faith committed during the seven hundred years of our monarchy." In his view, the book had unleashed a wave of atheism in Portugal, and the name of Volney alone was sufficient reason to throw a book into the flames.)

The work was also translated into Arabic around 1817 by Basile Fakhr, a Lebanese resident of Egypt who served as an agent of the French consulate in Damietta. No copy of this translation has survived.
