= Sosso (surname) =

Sosso is a surname. Notable people with the surname include:

- Issouf Sosso (born 1996), Burkinabé football defender
- Lorenzo Sosso, American poet
- Reine Sosso (born 1993), Cameroonian football goalkeeper
