= Epistolary poem =

Poem written in the form of an epistle or letter

An epistolary poem, also called a verse letter or letter poem, is a poem written in the form of an epistle or letter. Epistolary poems may address real or fictional recipients and can range from personal or romantic subjects to moral, philosophical, and political themes.

== History ==
The form dates to antiquity. Horace used verse epistles for moral and philosophical reflection in his Epistles, while Ovid's Heroides consists of fictional letters in verse from women of Greek and Roman mythology to their absent lovers. These two approaches, letters presented as communications from the poet and fictional letters spoken through a persona, became recurring forms of epistolary poetry.

The form continued in European poetry through the Middle Ages, Renaissance, and eighteenth century. In English, examples include Samuel Daniel's Letter from Octavia to Marcus Antonius (1599), Alexander Pope's Eloisa to Abelard (1717), Moral Essays (1731–1735), and Epistle to Dr Arbuthnot (1735).

== See also ==
- Epistolary novel
- Letter collection
