= James Cawthorn =

English poet and schoolmaster (1719–1761)

- Born: 1719
- Died: 1761

James Cawthorn (sometimes spelt Cawthorne) was born in Sheffield on 4 November 1719 and died in Tonbridge on 15 April 1761. A school master in holy orders, he was a minor English poet and imitator of Alexander Pope.

== Life ==
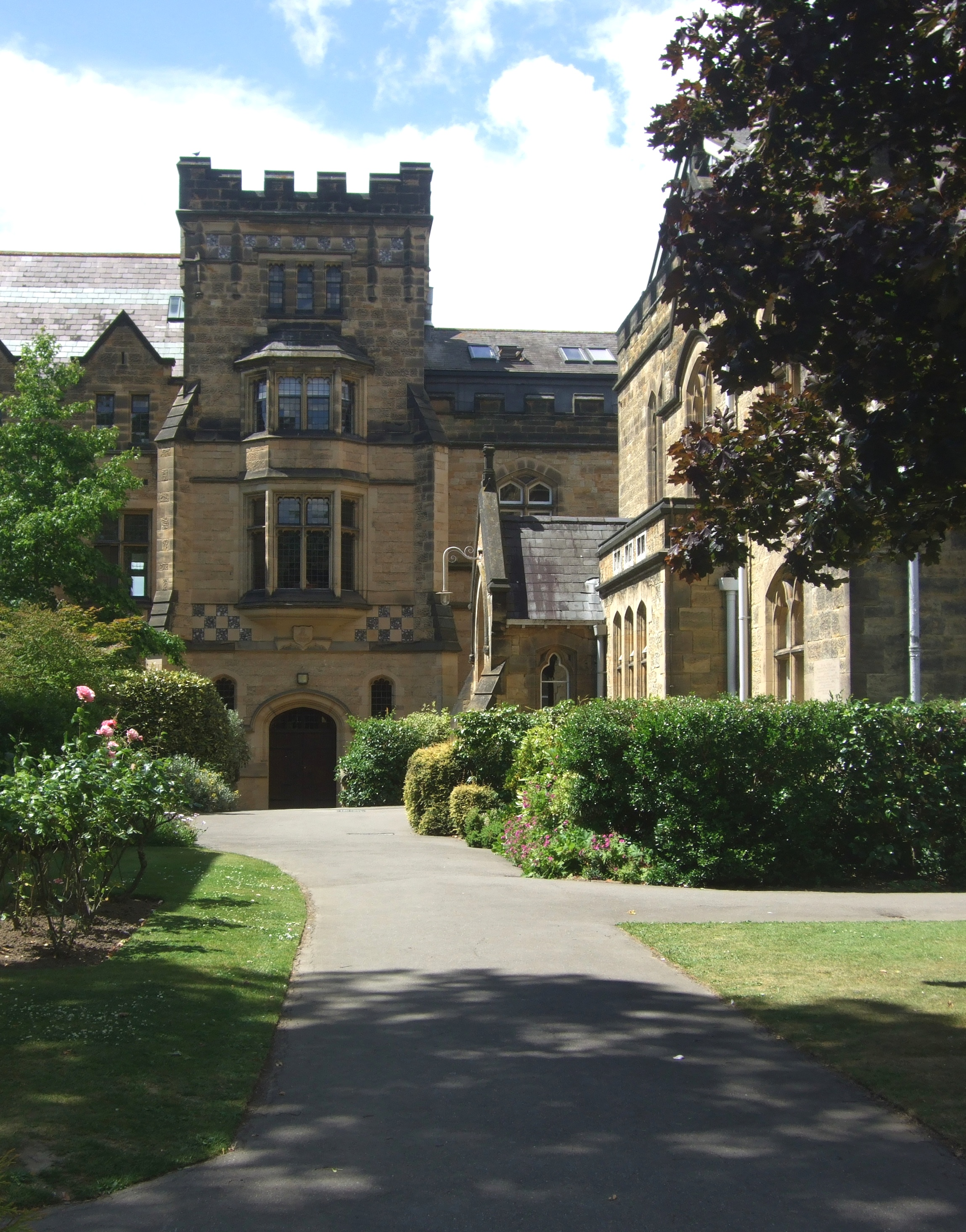
The old front of Tonbridge School where Cawthorn taught

James Cawthorn was the son of a Sheffield upholsterer and cabinet-maker. He was first educated at Sheffield Grammar School, and then in 1735 was sent to school at Kirkby Lonsdale, where he began writing poetry. No copy remains of the first of his poems to be published, “The Perjured Lover or tragical adventures of Alexis and Boroina, in heroic verse, from the story of Inkle and Yarico” (Sheffield 1736). That year too he was employed as a teaching assistant in Rotherham. Although he matriculated at Clare College, Cambridge, in 1738, he does not seem to have stayed there and is next heard of as an assistant to Martin Clare, head of an academy at 8 Soho Square, whose daughter Mary he married.

In 1743 Cawthorn was made head master of Tonbridge School, by which time he had taken holy orders and sometime later was styling himself M.A. The lasting memorial of his incumbency there was the library that he persuaded the Governors to build at the south end of the school in 1756, which survives today as the Headmaster's house and the Skinners' Library. A few poems and sermons of his now began to be published; principally, however, his poems were declaimed on the annual visitation days from the Worshipful Company of Skinners, who were the school's patrons. The poet Robert Southey facetiously remarked in his brief notes on Cawthorn that “He was fond of riding other horses besides that which he borrowed of the Muses,” and it was remembered of him that, as an admirer of concerts and operas, he had been known to ride to London in order to be present at a musical performance, returning in time for the start of school at seven next morning. Eventually he died after being thrown from his horse in April, 1761. His grave in Tonbridge church is marked by a Latin epitaph on a marble tablet.

== Poetry ==
It was not until 1771 that Cawthorn's poems were collected and printed by subscription. They were for the most part ethical epistles and moral poems in the manner of Alexander Pope. Sometimes, it was noted in Alexander Chalmers' General Biographical Dictionary, "his imitations are so close as to appear the effect rather of memory than of judgment". Echoes of Pope's "Eloisa to Abelard" might be expected in Cawthorn's reply, "Abelard to Eloisa" (1747). However, his other attempt at an Ovidian heroic epistle, "Lady Jane Grey to Lord Guildford Dudley" (1753), suggests the influence of his real model in its very first line: "From these dark cells in sable pomp arrayed", which echoes that of Pope's epistle, "In these deep solitudes and awful cells". Yet another echo from the same source occurs in Cawthorn's "On Taste" (1756), where the line "In the pure sunshine of the soul divine" seems a half-memory of Pope's "The eternal sunshine of the spotless mind".

Though his poem "On Taste" takes the fourth of Pope's "Moral Essays" as its starting point, the examples he gives make original fun of the contemporary fad for chinoiserie:

Of late, ‘tis true, quite sick of Rome and Greece,
We fetch our models from the wise Chinese…
Form’d on his plans, our farms and seats begin
To match the boasted villas of Pekin,
On every hill a spire-crown’d temple swells,
Hung round with serpents and a fringe of bells…
In Tartar huts our cows and horses lie,
Our hogs are fatten’d in an Indian stye…
While o’er our cabinets Confucius nods
‘Midst porcelain elephants and China gods.

The independent observation there has been quoted by later critics as acute evidence of the change in fashion since the Classicism of Pope's day. Another critic has remarked on the original way Cawthorn's verse essays mediate to a later middle class audience the "aristocratic ethics" originally propounded by the Earl of Shaftesbury.

Though Cawthorn's “Abelard and Eloisa” followed in the train of the earlier imitations of Pope that were written immediately on its publication, there had been none since 1730. His poem of 1747 not only heads a new wave of them but seems to have been the most continuously reprinted. Before his posthumous 1771 collection, it had reappeared in The Poetical Calendar (1763) and George Pearch's Collection of Poems in Two Volumes (1768). By 1781 it had joined Pope's original in John Hughes’ The Letters of Abelard and Heloise: with a particular account of their lives, amours, and misfortune, a work that, with later additions, continued in print not only in Britain but in Europe and the United States well into the 19th century.

Besides subsequent reprints of Cawthorn’s collected poems in one format or another, there was one other popular source for the poem, or its opening lines at least. These had been set as "Abelard: a sacred glee" by John Wall Callcott and the words alone appeared in The poetry of various glees, songs, &c (London, 1798), of which there were many later reproductions. As late as 1843, both words and music were included in The British Minstrel. Despite the caviling of critics that the poem fell short of its original model, the conclusion to be drawn from its persistence for a century after its original appearance is of a popularity outlasting his other works.

== Bibliography ==
- Edward Goodwin, “Original Memoirs of Mr James Cawthorn”, Gentleman’s Magazine vol.61, 1791, pp.1081-83
- Humphreys, Jennett. "Cawthorn, James" . In Stephen, Leslie (ed.). Dictionary of National Biography. Vol. 09. London: Smith, Elder & Co. pp. 380–381.
- Biography and poetry in The Poems of Hill, Cawthorn, and Bruce, Chiswick 1822

Cawthorne, Martin J 'James Cawthorn, George Austen and The Curious Case of the Schoolboy Who was Killed' Matador 2017 ISBN 978 1785898 600
