= Bernard d'Agesci =

French painter

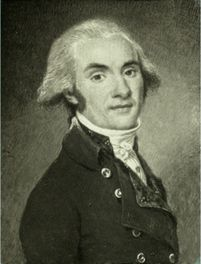
Self-portrait (date unknown)

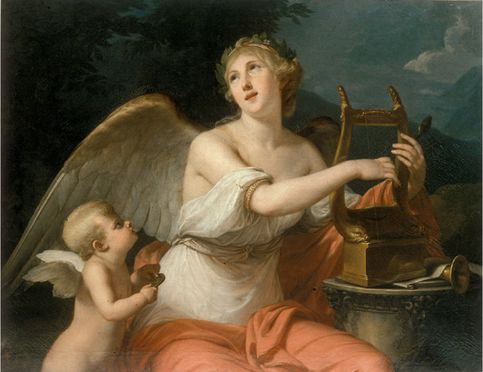
The Muse Erato (1785/6)

Bernard d'Agesci was the pseudonym of Augustin Bernard (11 March 1756/57 – 6 July 1828/29), a French painter of religious and mythological scenes and portraits.

== Biography ==
He was born in Niort. He displayed an early talent for art that was noticed by the Marquis d'Argenson, a noted art collector. In 1779, encouraged by this, he left Niort to visit the museums in Paris and pursue a career in art at the Académie Royale. While there, he was a student of Jean-Bernard Restout and Louis Jean François Lagrenée. He also made the acquaintance of Jacques-Louis David.

Four years later, he was sent to the Villa Medici in Rome, as a pensioner of King Louis XVI, under the sponsorship of Joseph-Marie Vien. He soon obtained a prize at the Accademia Clementina in Bologna for his painting of Erato. Upon returning to France, he became a portrait painter for the aristocracy.

The Revolution effectively put an end to his career in Paris. Just as he was preparing to become a member of the Académie in 1792, it was abolished. He rejoined his family in Niort and was able to continue working with relatively little interference. He created a small museum there and was involved in organizing their first public library, donating 20,000 volumes brought from Paris with the assistance of a local curé. His interest in science also led to the establishment of a botanical garden.

From 1802, he was the Director of the community's Free School of Drawing. In addition to his paintings, he produced several altarpieces for the local churches and helped restore several buildings.

Agesci died in Niort in 1828 or 1829. His self-designed home, the Italian influenced Villa Rose, is now a historical landmark. His museum, reorganized and installed in a former girls' school, has been named after him.
