= Jean Gaulmier =

French orientalist

Jean Joseph Antoine Gaulmier (10 March 1905, Charenton-du-Cher – 11 November 1997, Paris) was a French orientalist who befriended Zaki al-Arsuzi, one of the principal founders of Ba'athism.
