= Juan María Maury =

Spanish writer

Juan María Maury (1772–1845) was a Spanish writer.
