= Aimé-Ambroise-Joseph Feutry =

Aimé-Ambroise-Joseph Feutry (1720–1789) was a French lawyer, writer, and engineer.

Born in Lille, France, Aimé initially pursued law before abandoning his career to become a writer in the early 1750s. From the success of his literary and poetic works he funded his tertiary occupation: developing military technology.

His renown in the literary world brought him into the elite social circles of Passy, where he encountered Benjamin Franklin, to whom he would write frequently. Feutry thereby adopted Franklin's cause of American Independence, composing verse in praise of the man and his mission.

He was elected as a member to the American Philosophical Society in 1786.
