= Lorenzo Sosso =

American poet (1867–1965)

- Born: March 2, 1867; New York, U.S.
- Died: October 1, 1965 (aged 98)
- Occupation: Poet

Lorenzo Sosso (March 2, 1867 – October 1, 1965) was an American poet who published several books of poetry in the late-19th and early-20th centuries. He was of Italian descent. Sosso published his first collection of poetry, Poems, when he was 21 years old, most of its contents having been written during his teenage years. In the preface to Poems, Sosso reveals his first language to have been Italian, but boasts that, despite whatever difficulties he may have had with writing poetry in English, he was "especially ordained by a superior power for such a calling." Although he was born in New York, Sosso lived in California for most of his career, especially in the San Francisco, where he was an acquaintance with more well-known participants in the city's literary scene, including Ina Coolbrith, the first poet laureate of the state. Sosso was living in the city during the 1906 San Francisco earthquake, upon which he remarked: "Out of the ashes thy life will requicken, / Courage loves fighting 'gainst terrible odds."

== Bibliography ==
- Poems, (1888)
- Poems on humanity and Abelard to Heloise, (1891)
- In the realms of gold : a book of verse, 1891-1901, (1902)
- Proverbs of the people : a cento of aphorisms reasonably rhymed (1904)
- Wisdom for the wise; a book of proverbs, (1907)
