= Anna von Helmholtz =

German salonnière and writer (1834–1899)

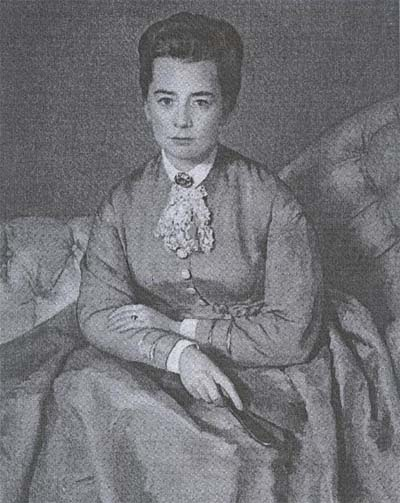
Von Helmholtz in 1869

Anna von Helmholtz (née von Mohl; 19 September 1834 – 1 December 1899) was a German salonnière and writer who translated or edited the translations of a number of scientific works. She was the second wife of the physicist Hermann von Helmholtz. Brought up in a circle in which intelligence and character were equally well developed, she was described as being talented and clever, with wide views and high aspirations.

== Early life ==
Anna von Mohl was born in Tübingen, 19 September 1834. Her father was Robert von Mohl, a Heidelberg professor, and a liberal member of the Frankfurt National Assembly. She had at least one sibling, a sister, Ida von Schmidt-Zabierow.

Anna spent long periods in Paris, staying with her uncle Julius von Mohl, Professor of Persian language at the College de France. His wife, Mary, was from England, and Anna went to her several times for long visits in Paris and England, where Anna acquired French and English manners and customs.

== Career ==
Helmholtz translated or edited the translations of a number of scientific works. Working with Estelle du Bois-Reymond, daughter of physiologist Emil du Bois-Reymond, they translated Oliver Lodge's Modern Views of Electricity (Neueste Anschauungen über Electricität. Leipzig 1896). With Clara Wiedemann she edited the translations of two of John Tyndall's books: Heat Considered as a Mode of Motion (Wärme betrachtet als eine Art der Bewegung, Braunschweig, 4th edition, 1894) and Sound: A Course of Eight Lectures (Der Schall, 3rd edition, 1897). Her work on the third edition of Tyndall's Heat was so good that Tyndall sent her a brooch in appreciation, and wrote to her that the German edition looked 'far better than the English edition and leaves the French nowhere.'

=== Salon ===
Helmholtz was well known in Berlin intellectual circles. In the salons of the time, each salonniere usually had a specific day people would meet in their home. The "Tuesdays" of Helmholtz were given special significance, above all, because they attracted a particularly large number of scholars, especially naturalists. For the first time, the country's academic elite was offered a first-class social floor. As an interface between the court society, the artists' scene and the educated middle classes, their house became the most important salon in the young empire and the prototype of bourgeois conviviality in the late 19th century. Her frequent guests included:

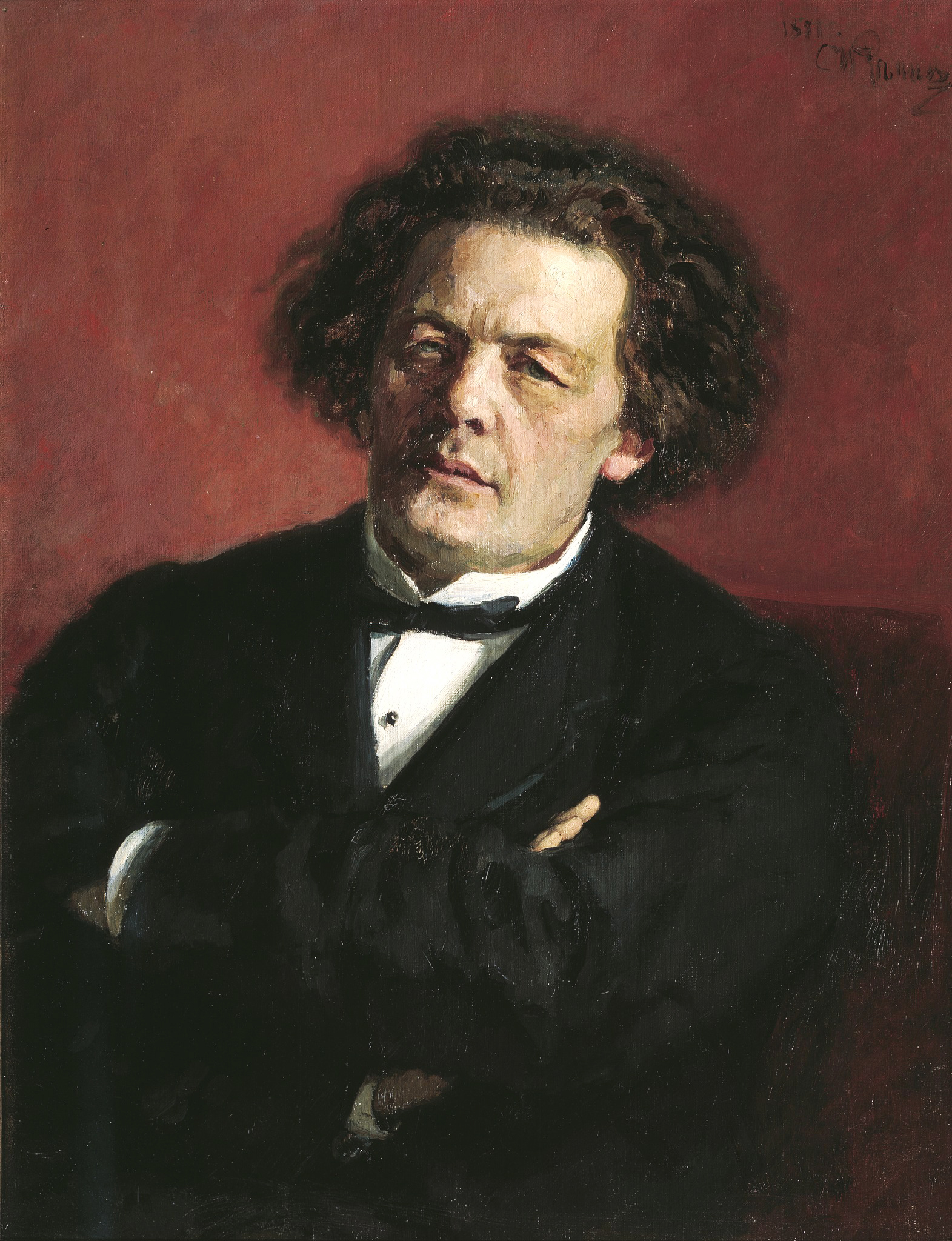
Pianist Anton Rubinstein

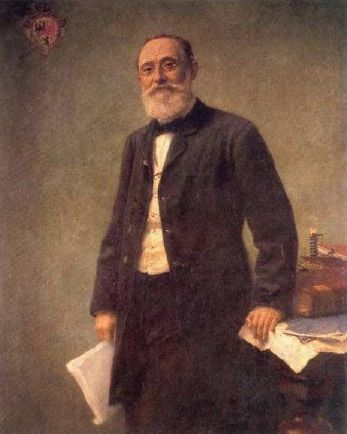
Rudolf Virchow was a frequent guest.

- John Dalberg-Acton, 1st Baron Acton
- Franz von Arenberg
- Ludwig Bamberger
- George Bancroft
- Reinhold Begas
- Ernst von Bergmann
- Arnold Böcklin
- Carl Wilhelm Borchardt
- Marianne Brandt
- Bernhard von Bülow
- Daniela von Bülow
- Marie von Bunsen
- Arthur Graf von Bylandt-Rheidt
- Ernst Curtius
- Rudolph von Delbrück
- Wilhelm Dilthey
- Emil du Bois-Reymond
- Karl Anton Eckert
- Siegmund Exner-Ewarten
- Carl Jakob Adolf Christian Gerhardt
- Herman Grimm
- Rudolf von Gneist
- Adolph von Hansemann
- Adolf von Harnack
- Ferdinand Graf von Harrach
- Friedrich von Hefner-Alteneck
- Albert Hertel
- Heinrich Hertz
- Hedwig Heyl
- Adolf von Hildebrand
- August Wilhelm von Hofmann
- Hans Hopfen
- Botho von Hülsen
- Bogdan Graf von Hutten-Czapski
- Joseph Joachim
- Herzog Karl Theodor in Bayern
- Robert von Keudell
- Gustav Kirchhoff
- Botho von dem Knesebeck
- Leo Königsberger
- Leopold Kronecker
- August Kundt
- Franz von Lenbach
- Karl Richard Lepsius
- Sabine Lepsius
- Otto Lessing
- Fanny Lewald
- Ernst von Leyden
- Richard Liebreich
- Walter von Loë
- Luise von Baden
- Morell Mackenzie
- Heinrich Gustav Magnus
- Maria Josepha von Portugal
- Prince Maximilian of Baden
- Robert von Mendelssohn
- Ernst von Mendelssohn-Bartholdy
- Adolph Menzel
- Paul Friedrich Meyerheim
- Laura Minghetti
- Johann von Miquel
- Mary Mohl-Clarke
- Moritz Mohl
- Robert von Mohl
- Theodor Mommsen
- Max Müller
- Albert Niemann
- Hedwig von Olfers
- Marie von Olfers
- Luise Gräfin von Oriola
- Maximiliane Gräfin von Oriola
- Ludwig Passini
- Georg Heinrich Pertz
- Maximilian von Philipsborn
- Raoul Pictet
- Karl von Piloty
- Max Planck
- Nathanael Pringsheim
- Joseph Maria von Radowitz
- Leopold von Ranke
- Adolf vom Rath
- Anna vom Rath
- Wilhelm Reiß
- Franz Reuleaux
- Prinz Heinrich VII. von Reuß
- Fanny Gräfin zu Reventlow
- Gustav Richter
- Raoul Richter
- Ferdinand von Richthofen
- Julius Rodenberg
- Franz von Roggenbach
- Anton Rubinstein
- Odo Russell
- Hermann von Schelling
- Wilhelm Scherer
- Alexander Graf von Schleinitz
- Marie Gräfin von Schleinitz
- Erich Schmidt
- Gustav von Schmoller
- Arnold von Siemens
- Werner von Siemens
- Carl von Spitzemberg
- Hildegard von Spitzemberg
- Hermann Sudermann
- Heinrich von Sybel
- Emerich Graf von Széchényi
- Hermann von Thile
- Heinrich von Treitschke
- Hugo von Tschudi
- Guido Graf von Usedom
- Kronprinzessin Viktoria von Preußen
- Rudolf von Virchow
- Richard Wachsmuth
- Cosima Wagner
- Richard Wagner
- Max Maria von Weber
- Anton von Werner
- Mathilde Wesendonk
- Andrew Dickson White
- Ernst von Wildenbruch
- Anton Graf von Wolkenstein
- Nina Gräfin Yorck von Wartenburg
- Eduard Zeller
- Raimund von zur-Mühlen

== Personal life ==
On 16 May 1861, she married von Helmholtz. Together they had three children: Robert von Helmholtz (1862–1889), Ellen von Helmholtz (1864–1941), ⚭ 1884 married Arnold von Siemens (1853–1918), and Friedrich Julius von Helmholtz (1868–1901).

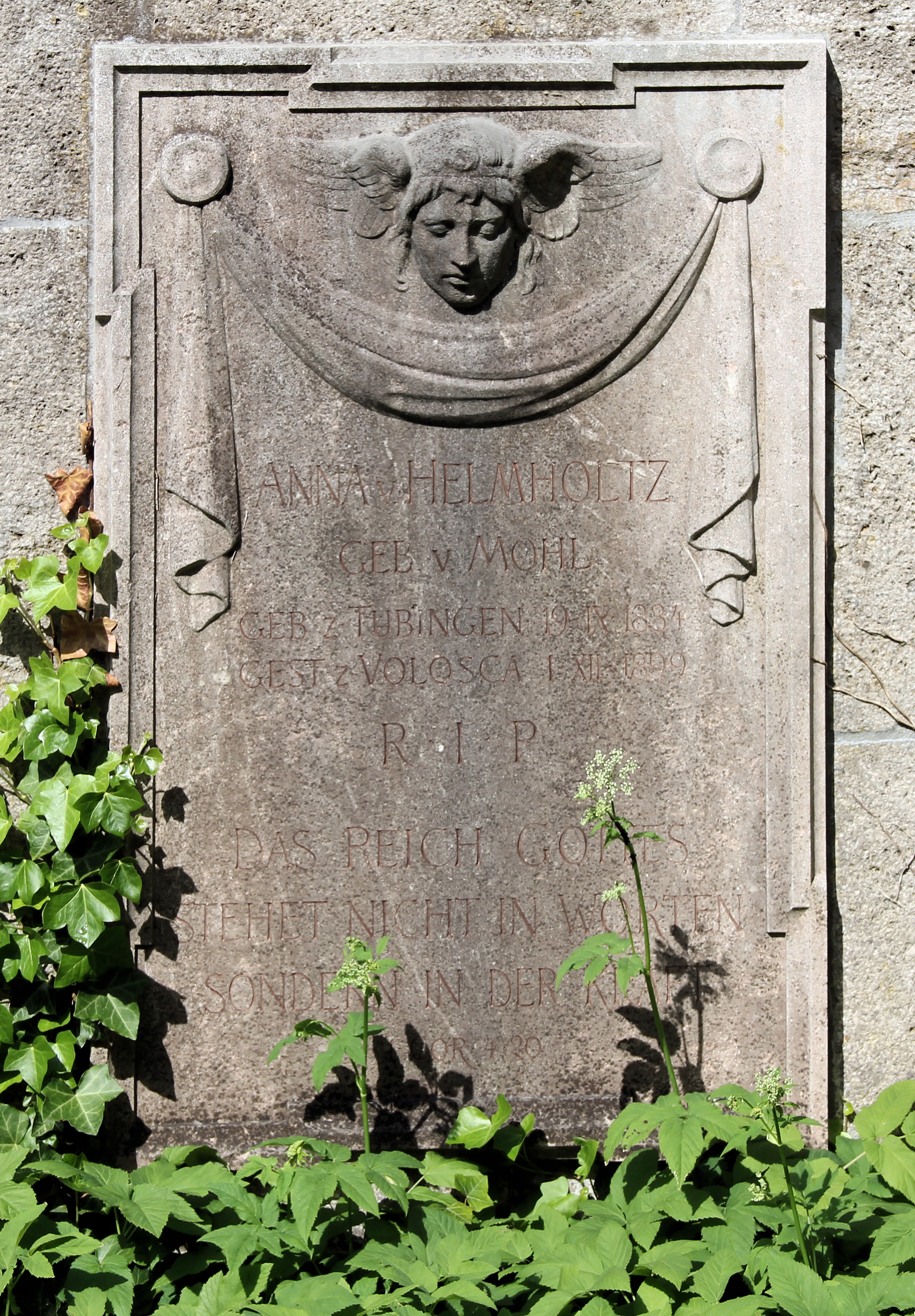
Grave of von Helmholtz

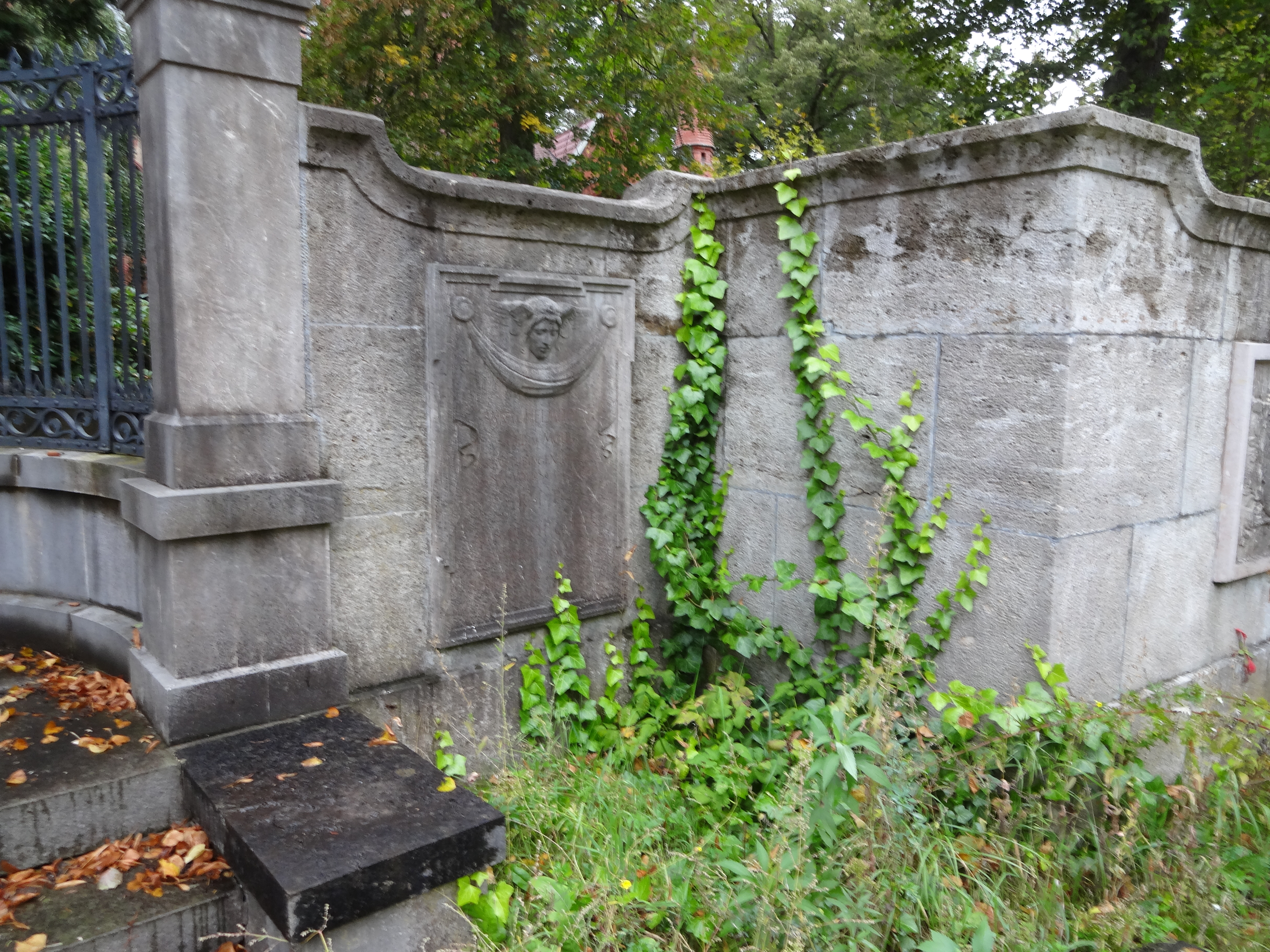
Grave of von Helmholtz

In December 1899, Anna died while on vacation in Volosca, Istria, Croatia, and is buried in Wannsee Cemetery in Berlin.
