= Clarkey =

Clarkey is the nickname of:

- Justin Clarke (born 1993), former Australian rules footballer
- Michael Clarke (cricketer) (born 1981), Australian cricketer
- Rikki Clarke (born 1981), English cricketer
- Mary Elizabeth Mohl (1793-1893), British writer and salon hostess (née Clarke)
