= August Grisebach =

German botanist of the 19th century

August Heinrich Rudolf Grisebach
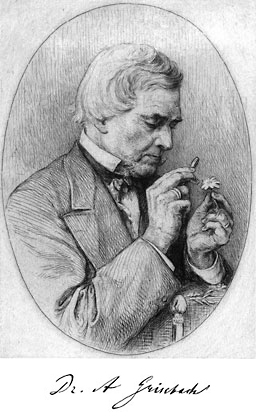
- Born: 17 April 1814; Hanover, Electorate of Hanover, Holy Roman Empire
- Died: 9 May 1879 (aged 65); Göttingen, Province of Hanover, Kingdom of Prussia
- Scientific career
- Author abbrev. (botany): Griseb.

August Heinrich Rudolf Grisebach (pronounced [ˈaʊɡʊst ˈhaɪnʁɪç ˈʁuːdɔlf ˈɡʁiːzəbax]; 17 April 1814 – 9 May 1879) was a German botanist and phytogeographer.

== Biography ==
Grisebach studied at the Lyceum in Hanover, the cloister-school at Ilfeld, and the University of Göttingen. He graduated in medicine from the University of Berlin in 1836. He undertook expeditions to Provence, Turkey, the Balkans, and Norway. In 1837 he became associate professor and in 1847 full professor at the medical faculty in Göttingen and was named director of the botanical garden there in 1875. While his main fields of interest were phytogeography and systematics, especially the Gentianaceae and Malpighiaceae, he considered his Flora of the British West Indian Islands his most important work. Much of his collection, especially the types of species described by him, are housed at the Göttingen University Herbarium. His taxonomic classification is set out in his Grundriss der systematischen Botanik (1854). His son Eduard was an author, lawyer and diplomat.

== Selected works ==
- Grisebach, August (1854). Grundriss der systematischen Botanik für akademische Vorlesungen entworfen (in German). Göttingen: Dieterichschen Buchhandlung. (Grundr. Syst. Bot.: Schema p. 68)
- Die Vegetation der Erde nach Ihrer Klimatischen Anordnung (The Earth's vegetation after its climatic arrangement), 1872 (1st Edition), 1884 (2nd Edition).
- Flora of the British West Indian Islands, Lovell Reeve & Co., London, 1864

== Bibliography ==
- Some Biogeographers, Evolutionists and Ecologists: Chrono-Biographical Sketches
- Detailed biography at the Allgemeine Deutsche Biographie
- Biographical entry in Meyers Konversationslexikon
- Obituary in Botanische Zeitung 1879
