= Claude Charles Fauriel =

French historian, philologist and critic (1772–1844)

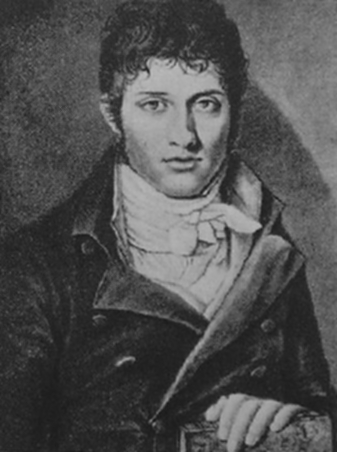

Interim Mayor of Saint-Étienne
- In office 21 December 1793 – 23 December 1793
- Preceded by: Jean-Baptiste Johannot
- Succeeded by: Jean-Baptiste Johannot

Personal details
- Born: 21 October 1772 Saint-Étienne, Loire, France
- Died: 15 June 1844 (aged 71)
- Resting place: Père Lachaise Cemetery

Claude Charles Fauriel (French pronunciation: [klod ʃaʁl foʁjɛl]; 21 October 1772 – 15 July 1844) was a French historian, philologist and critic.

== Biography ==
He was born at Saint-Étienne, Loire, the son of a poor joiner, but received a good education in the Oratorian colleges of Tournon and Lyon. He was twice in the army—at Perpignan in 1793, and in 1796–1797 at Briançon, as private secretary to General J Servan de Gerbey (1741–1808); but he preferred the civil service and the companionship of his friends and his books. In 1794 he returned to St Etienne, where, but only for a short period, he filled a municipal office; and from 1797 to 1799 he devoted himself to strenuous study, more especially of the literature and history, both ancient and modern, of Greece and Italy. Having paid a visit to Paris in 1799, he was introduced to Joseph Fouché, minister of police, becoming his private secretary. Though he discharged the duties of this office to Fouché's satisfaction, his strength was worn out by study, and in 1801 he was forced to take a three-month trip in the south. His health also resulted in his resigning his office in the following year, though his actions also had something to do with his scruples about serving longer under Napoleon, when the latter, in violation of his declared republican principles, became consul for life. This is clearly shown by the fragments of Mémoirs discovered by Ludovic Lalanne and published in 1886.

Some articles which Fauriel published in the Decade philosophique (1800) on a work of Madame de Staël's—De la littérature considerée dans ses rapports avec les institutions sociales—led to friendship with her. The salon of Mme de Condorcet was a rallying point for the dissentient republicans. Fauriel was introduced by Madame de Staël to the literary circle of Auteuil, which gathered round Antoine Destutt de Tracy and the idéologues. Those who enjoyed his closest intimacy were the physiologist Cabanis (Madame de Condorcet's brother-in-law), the poet Alessandro Manzoni, the publicist Benjamin Constant, and François Guizot. Later Destutt de Tracy introduced to him Augustin Thierry (1821) and perhaps Adolphe Thiers and François Mignet.

He began a relationship with the Marquis de Condorcet's widow, Sophie, in 1801, and lived openly with her until 1822, when she died.

In June 1822 the intellectual Mary Clarke and her mother visited England and Scotland. Fauriel revealed his interest in her when he wrote to Mary concerning Auguste Sirey who had been spoken of as Mary's fiancé. It had been proposed that Sirey would go to England with them. Mary would eventually marry Julius von Mohl.

During his connection with Auteuil, Fauriel's attention turned to philosophy, and he began work on a history of Stoicism, which was never completed, all the papers connected with it having accidentally perished in 1814. He also studied Arabic, Sanskrit and the old South French dialects. He published in 1810 a translation of the Parthenais of the Danish poet Baggesen, with a preface on the various kinds of poetry; in 1823 translations of two tragedies of Manzoni, with a preface "Sur la théorie de l'art dramatique"; and in 1824-1825 his translation of the popular songs of modern Greece, with a "Discours préliminaire" on popular poetry.

The revolution of July, which put his friends in power, opened to him the career of higher education. In 1830 he became professor of foreign literature at the Sorbonne. The Histoire de la Gaule méridionale sous la domination des conquerants germains (4 vols., 1836) was the only completed section of a general history of southern France which he had projected. In 1836 he was elected a member of the Academy of Inscriptions, and in 1837 he published (with an introduction the conclusions of which would not now all be endorsed) a translation of a Provençal poem on the Albigensian war. After his death his friend Mary Clarke (afterwards Madame J. Möhl) published his Histoire de la poésie provençale (3 vols., 1846)--his lectures for 1831–1832. Fauriel had a preconceived and somewhat fanciful theory that Provence was the cradle of the chansons de geste and even of the Round Table romances; but he gave a great stimulus to the scientific study of Old French and Provençal. Dante et les engines de la langue et de la littérature italiennes (2 vols.) was published in 1854.

Fauriel's Mémoires, found with Condorcet's papers, are in the Institute library. They were written at latest in 1804, and include some interesting fragments on the close of the consulate, Moreau, etc. Though anonymous, Lalanne, who published them (Les Derniers Jours du Consulat, 1886), proved them to be in the same handwriting as a letter of Fauriel's in 1803.
