= Linda Richards (neuroscientist) =

Australian neurobiologist, educator and researcher

Linda Jane Richards AO FAA FAHMS
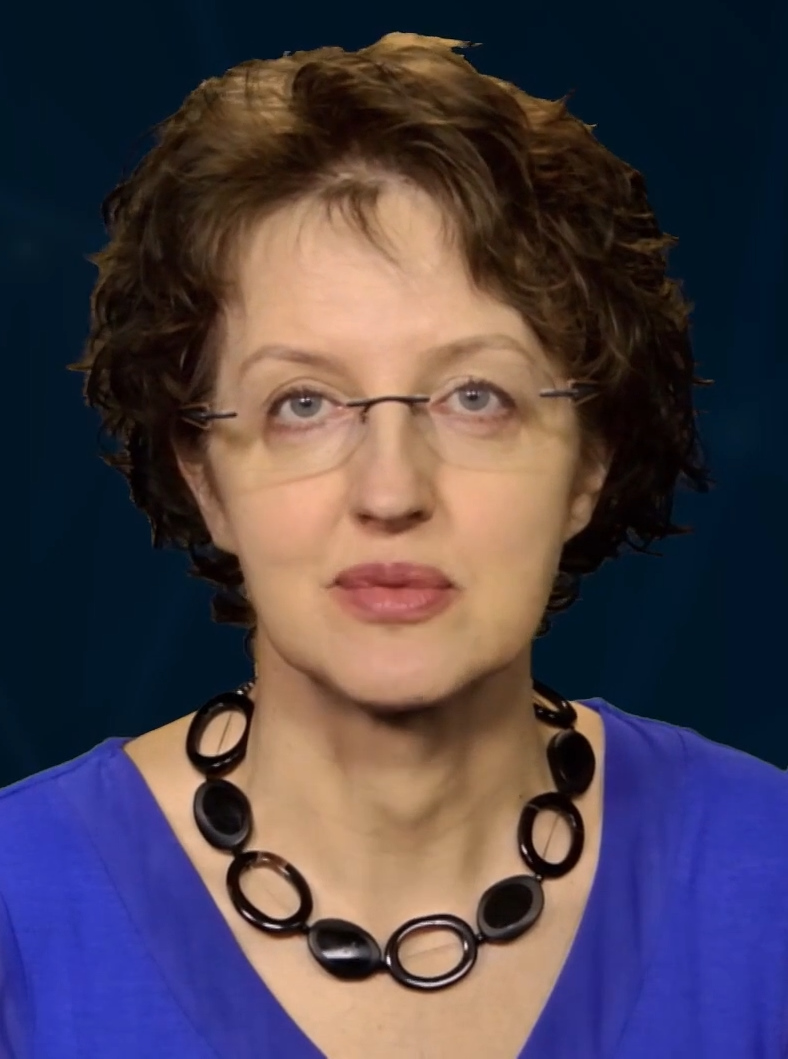
- Linda Richards in 2017
- Born: Australia
- Citizenship: Australian
- Education: University of Melbourne, Walter and Eliza Hall Institute
- Scientific career
- Fields: Neuroscience
- Workplaces: Washington University School of Medicine
- Doctoral advisor: Perry Bartlett

Linda Jane Richards is an Australian developmental neurobiologist, and is currently head of the Department of Neuroscience and the Edison Professor of Neurobiology at Washington University in St. Louis. She was appointed as an Officer of the Order of Australia (AO) in 2019, Fellow of the Australian Academy of Health and Medical Sciences (FAHMS) in 2016, and Fellow of the Australian Academy of Science (FAAS) in 2015.

Richards is known for her work on the corpus callosum, the bundle of nerves that connects the left and right hemispheres of the brain. She is a founding member of International Consortium for the Corpus Callosum and Cerebral Connectivity (IRC5), a past president of the Australasian Neuroscience Society, and the founder of the Australian Brain Bee Championship.

== Early life and education ==
Richards undertook undergraduate studies at Monash University, and at the University of Melbourne, where she was awarded a Bachelor of Science in 1990. Her PhD ("Regulation of differentiation and lineage determination in the central nervous system," under the supervision of Perry Bartlett), which researched the determination of neuronal lineage in the developing spinal cord, was conferred in 1995 by the University of Melbourne.

== Research and career ==
Richards began her postdoctoral training at the Salk Institute of Biological Studies, in the laboratory of Professor Dennis O'Leary. In 1997 she established her own laboratory at the University of Maryland medical school. In 2005 she returned to Australia, taking up a position at the University of Queensland, where she was appointed associate professor in the Queensland Brain Institute, and the School of Biomedical Sciences. She was subsequently promoted to Professor in 2010.

Richards has been the Chair of the Department of Neuroscience at the Washington University in St. Louis since 2021. Richards is also the head of the Cortical Development and Axon Guidance Laboratory at the QBI. The laboratory researches the cellular and molecular mechanisms which regulate the formation and development of the corpus callosum. The research focus of her laboratory to study the development of the cortical midline in animal models and in human tissue. In particular, she is involved in researching a phenomenon where the corpus callosum is absent (agenesis) or disformed (dysgenesis) in the developing brain. This condition affects 1 in 4000 people, and is associated with 50 different human congenital disorders.

== Professional appointments ==
- Chief Scientific Advisor and Patron for the Australian Disorders of the Corpus Callosum
- Founding member of the International Brain Initiative
- Scientific Advisory Board of the International Brain Lab
- Previous Chair of the Australian Brain Alliance
- Previous Advisory Panel for Million Minds Research Mission

== Awards and honours ==
- 1990 Colman Speed Award awarded by the Walter and Eliza Hall Institute for the top Honours student
- 2004 C.J. Herrick Award awarded by the American Association of Anatomy, to "recognize young investigators who make important contributions to the field of comparative neurology"
- 2010 Nina Kondelos Prize for "outstanding contribution to basic or clinical neuroscience research" awarded by the Australian Neuroscience Society.
- 2013 Equity and Diversity Award awarded by the University of Queensland.
- 2015 elected Fellow of the Australian Academy of Science.
- 2016 elected Fellow of the Australian Academy of Health and Medical Sciences.
- 2019 Queen's Birthday Honours — Officer of the Order of Australia (AO) for "distinguished service to medical research and education in the field of developmental neurobiology, and to community engagement in science".
- 2020 Krieg Cortical Discoverer Award awarded by the Cajal Club

== Selected publications ==
Richards has published over 220 articles. Her most cited articles include Agenesis of the corpus callosum: genetic, developmental and functional aspects of connectivity (2007), Neuropilin-1 conveys semaphorin and VEGF signaling during neural and cardiovascular development (2003), and De novo generation of neuronal cells from the adult mouse brain (1992).

== Brain Bee Challenge ==
In 2006, Richards founded the Australian-New Zealand Brain Bee Challenge. This a competition for secondary students interested in neuroscience. The goal is to educate students and teachers about neuroscience and to encourage students from rural Australia and New Zealand to become involved in neuroscience.

== Other sources ==
- Suárez, R; Fenlon, LR; Marek, R; Avitan, L; Sah, P; Goodhill, GJ; Richards, LJ (2014). "Balanced interhemispheric cortical activity is required for correct targeting of the corpus callosum". Neuron. 82 (6): 1289–98. doi:10.1016/j.neuron.2014.04.040. PMID 24945772.
- Moldrich, RX; Gobius, I; Pollak, T; Zhang, J; Ren, T; Brown, L; Mori, S; De Juan, Romero C; Britanova, O; Tarabykin, V; Richards, LJ (2010). "Molecular regulation of the developing commissural plate". J. Comp. Neurol. 518 (18): 3645–61. doi:10.1002/cne.22445. PMC 2910370. PMID 20653027.
