= List of biomedical science awards =

This list of biomedical science awards is an index to notable awards for biomedical sciences, a set of sciences applying portions of natural science or formal science, or both, to knowledge, interventions, or technology that are of use in health care or public health.

== Awards ==
| Country | Award | Sponsor | Notes |
|---|---|---|---|
| Australia | Florey Medal | Australian Institute of Policy and Science | Biomedical research |
| Australia | Suzanne Cory Medal for Biomedical Sciences | Australian Academy of Science | Biomedical or biological research |
| Belgium | Oswald Vander Veken Prize | Research Foundation – Flanders (FWO) and the Fonds de la Recherche Scientifique-FNRS (F.R.S.-FNRS) | original contribution to knowledge about the tumours of the locomotor system (bone and soft tissue tumours) |
| Canada | Canada Gairdner International Award | Gairdner Foundation | Outstanding discoveries or contributions to medical science |
| Canada | Prix Michel-Sarrazin | Club de Recherches Clinique du Québec | Québécois scientist who has contributed in an important way to the advancement of biomedical research |
| Canada | Robert L. Noble Prize | Canadian Cancer Society | Contributions that have led to a significant advance in cancer research |
| France | Leopold Griffuel Prize | ARC Foundation for Cancer Research | Reward the accomplishments of and encourage further research among the world's leading cancer researchers |
| France, United States | Richard Lounsbery Award | French Academy of Sciences, National Academy of Sciences | American and French scientists, 45 years or younger, in recognition of extraordinary scientific achievement in biology and medicine |
| Germany | Meyenburg Prize | Meyenburg Foundation, German Cancer Research Center | Outstanding achievements in cancer research |
| Hungary | Debrecen Award for Molecular Medicine | University of Debrecen | Extraordinary achievements in the field of biomedicine |
| International | Edison Award | Edison Awards | Honoring excellence in innovation |
| International | UNESCO/Institut Pasteur Medal | UNESCO, Pasteur Institute | Outstanding research contributing to a beneficial impact on human health and to the advancement of scientific knowledge in related fields such as medicine, fermentations, agriculture and food |
| Switzerland | Cloëtta Prize | Max Cloëtta Foundation | Personalities who have distinguished themselves in biomedical research |
| Portugal | BIAL Award in Biomedicine | BIAL Foundation | Recognises a work published in the biomedical field within the last ten years, the results of which are considered of exceptional quality and scientific relevance. |
| United States | Albert Lasker Award for Basic Medical Research | Lasker Foundation | Outstanding discovery, contribution and achievement in the field of medicine and human physiology |
| United States | ASCB Public Service Award | American Society for Cell Biology | Outstanding national leadership in support of biomedical research |
| United States | Kettering Prize | General Motors Cancer Research Foundation | Outstanding recent contribution to the diagnosis or treatment of cancer |
| United States | Komen Brinker Award for Scientific Distinction | Susan G. Komen | Significant work in advancing research concepts or clinical application in the fields of breast cancer research, screening or treatment |
| United States | Lasker-DeBakey Clinical Medical Research Award | Lasker Foundation | Outstanding work for the understanding, diagnosis, prevention, treatment, and cure of disease |
| United States | Lurie Prize in Biomedical Sciences | Foundation for the National Institutes of Health | Outstanding achievement by a promising young scientist in biomedical research |
| United States | Massry Prize | Keck School of Medicine of USC | Scientists who have made substantial recent contributions in the biomedical sciences |
| United States | Maxwell Finland Award | National Foundation for Infectious Diseases | Outstanding contributions to the understanding of infectious diseases or public health |
| United States | Searle Scholars Program | Chicago Community Trust | Professionals in biomedical research and chemistry who have made important, innovative research contributions |
| United States | Rosenstiel Award | Brandeis University | Distinguished work in basic medical research |
| United States | Warren Alpert Foundation Prize | Harvard Medical School and the Warren Alpert Foundation | Scientific achievements that have led to the prevention, cure or treatment of human diseases or disorders, and/or whose research constitutes a seminal scientific finding that holds great promise of ultimately changing our understanding of or ability to treat disease |
| United States | William B. Coley Award | Cancer Research Institute | Outstanding achievements in the fields of basic and tumor immunology and whose work has deepened our understanding of the immune system's response to disease, including cancer |

== See also ==
- Lists of awards
- Lists of science and technology awards
- List of biology awards
- List of medicine awards
