= Oxford Cambridge Intervarsity Australian Rules Football Match =

The annual Oxford-Cambridge Intervarsity Australian Rules Football Match is the most prolonged running Australian rules football fixture outside Australia. Played as early as 1911, it has been contested annually by men's teams since 1923 between the two longest running clubs outside Australia, the Oxford University Australian Rules Football Club (founded in 1906) and the Cambridge University Australian Rules Football Club (believed to have been founded around 1911).

The match has half blue status. Oxford has thus far dominated the contest. The teams contest a trophy which has been engraved.

Over the years, some distinguished Australians including Rhodes scholars have played in the match including Mike Fitzpatrick, Chris Maxwell, Joe Santamaria, Sir Rod Eddington and Andrew Michelmore.

A women's match was added in 2018.

== History ==
As early as 1911, the game was being played regularly at Oxford with records of the university's Australian rules football club's foundation dating to 1906. The Cambridge University Australian Rules Football Club is believed to have been founded around 1911. In 1911, Oxford University, captained by Alfred Clemens, defeated Cambridge University, captained by Ron Larking 13.9 (87) to 5.12 (42). In 1914, H C A Harrison reported that the game was being played regularly at both Oxford and Cambridge universities though few records exist of contests between 1911 and 1921.

After the war, in 1921, the Oxford University–Cambridge University Varsity match between expatriate Australian students became an annual contest.

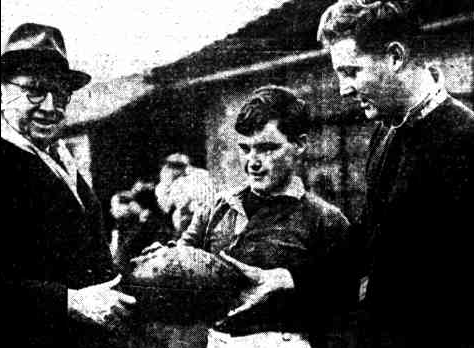
Australia's High Commissioner in London with the captains of the Oxford and Cambridge teams in 1949

The 90th Varsity match was the subject of a short ABC documentary (Video on YouTube).

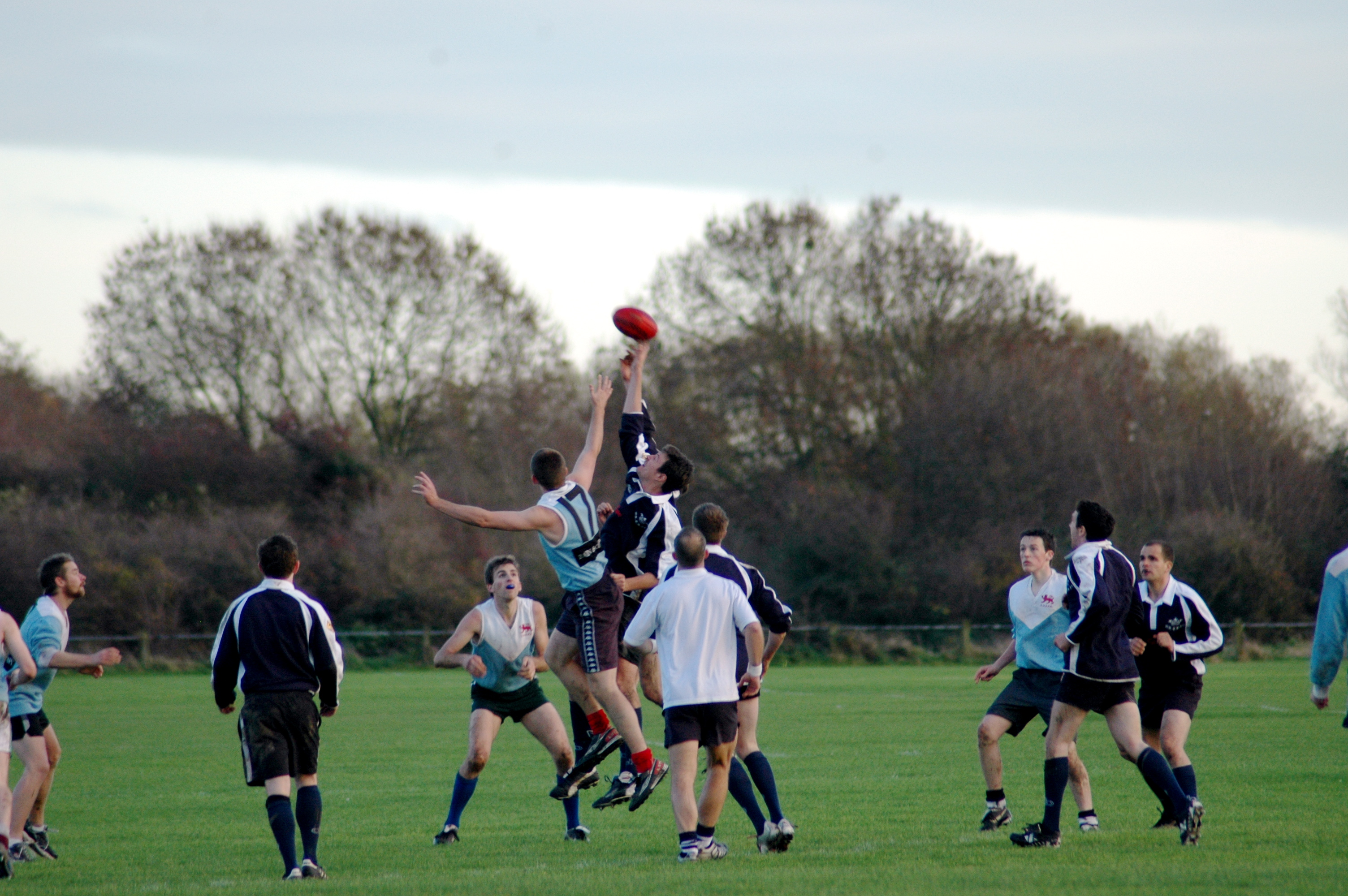
Oxford against Cambridge circa 2008

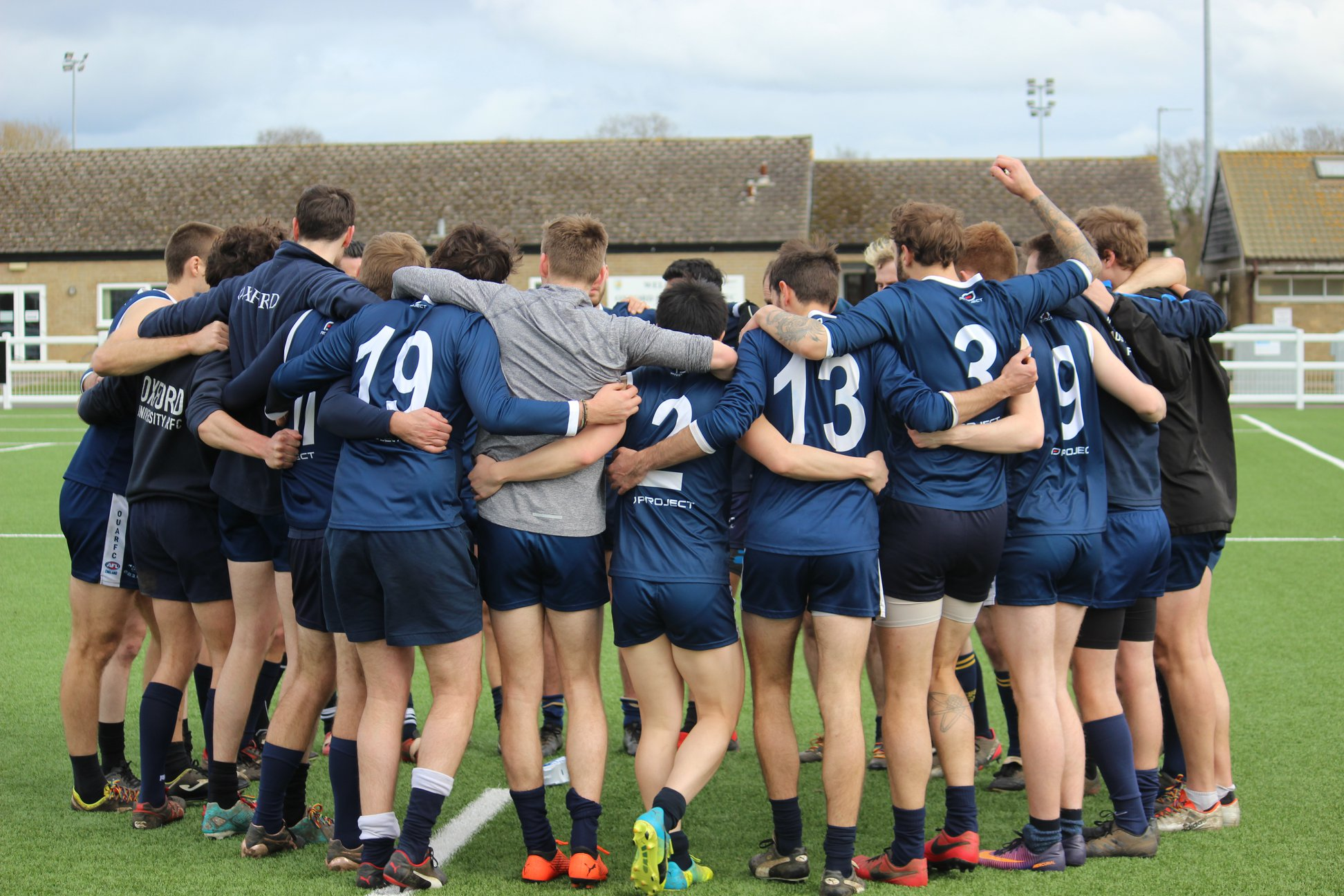
OUARFC Men's team at the 2020 Varsity Match played in Oxford

== Results ==
=== Men's ===
Year	Winner	Results	Notes
1911	Oxford	Oxford 13.9 (87) d Cambridge 5.12 (42)	
1923	Oxford	Oxford ?.? (80) d Cambridge ?.? (30)	
1925	Oxford	Oxford 10.17 (77) d. Cambridge 1.11 (17)	
1926	Cambridge	Cambridge 8.11 (59) d Oxford 8.7 (55)	
1927	Oxford	Oxford 10.10 (70) d. Cambridge 5.10 (40)	
1928	Cambridge	Cambridge 11.12 (78) d Oxford 5.10 (40)	
1929	Oxford	Oxford 9.19 (73) d Cambridge 5.9 (39)	Morphett (of Geelong) captained Oxford while Mann (of Geelong) captained Cambridge.
1930	Oxford	Oxford 4.4 (28) d Cambridge 4.2 (26)	
1931	Oxford	Oxford 12.11 (83) d Cambridge 7.5 (47)	
1935	Oxford	Oxford 9.8 (62) d Cambridge 1.4 (10)	
1948	Oxford	Oxford 11.8 (74) d Cambridge 0.3 (3)	
1949	Oxford	Oxford 12.6 (78) d Cambridge 3.13 (31)	
1954	Oxford	Oxford 12.10 (82) d Cambridge 8.10 (58)	Likely the first Australian Rules football game broadcast on television.
1983	Cambridge	Cambridge 15.10 (100) d Oxford 7.9 (51)	
1984	Cambridge	Cambridge 15.10 (100) d. Oxford 7.9 (51)	
1985	Cambridge	Cambridge 15.11 (101) d. Oxford 6.15 (51)	
1986	Cambridge	Cambridge 9.6 (60) d. Oxford 4.4 (28)	
1987	Oxford	Oxford 8.10 (58) d. Cambridge 5.9 (39)	
1988	Oxford	Oxford 7.10 (52) d. Cambridge 5.9 (39)	
1989	Oxford	Oxford 11.14 (80) d. Cambridge 4.6 (30)	
1990			No engraving on trophy
1991	Oxford	Oxford 10.15 (75) d. Cambridge 3.3 (21)	
1992	Oxford	Oxford 6.4 (30) d. Cambridge 1.4 (10)	
1993	Oxford	Oxford 15.20 (110) d. Cambridge 5.5 (35)	
1994	Oxford	Oxford 7.7 (49) d. Cambridge 5.4 (34)	
1995	Oxford	Oxford 12.11 (83) d. Cambridge 11.7 (73)	
1996	Cambridge	Cambridge 9.18 (72) d. Oxford 8.9 (57)	
1997	Cambridge	Cambridge 4.7 (31) d. Oxford 3.8 (26)	
1998	Oxford	Oxford 10.12 (72) d. Cambridge 3.8 (26)	
1999	Oxford	Oxford 13.11 (89) d. Cambridge 1.13 (19)	
2000	Oxford	Oxford 9.10 (64) d. Cambridge 7.5 (47)	
2001	Cambridge	Cambridge 6.13 (49) d. Oxford 5.16 (46)	
2002	Oxford	Oxford 17.17 (119) d. Cambridge 1.2 (8)	
2003	Oxford	Oxford 10.7 (67) d. Cambridge 0.5 (5)	
2004	Cambridge	Cambridge 3.4 (22) d. Oxford 2.6 (18)	
2005	Oxford	Oxford 14.15 (99) d. Cambridge 3.4 (22)	
2006	Oxford	Oxford 32 d. Cambridge 27	
2007	Oxford	Oxford 19.11 (125) d. Cambridge 3.10 (28)	Highest ever score recorded
2008	Oxford	Oxford 8.11 (59) def Cambridge 5.2 (32)	
2009	Oxford	Oxford 6.15 (51) d. Cambridge 1.1 (7)	
2010	Oxford	Oxford 17.16 (118) d. Cambridge 9.12 (66)	Highest scoring match to date
2011	Oxford	Oxford 17.16 (118) d. Cambridge 9.12 (66)	Highest scoring match to date
2012	Oxford	Oxford 9.11 (65) d. Cambridge 4.12 (36)	
2013	Oxford	Oxford 10.6 (66) d. Cambridge 3.6 (24)	
2014	Oxford	Oxford 14.6 (90) d. Cambridge 2.2 (14)	
2015	Cambridge	Cambridge 7.13 (55) d. Oxford 3.4 (22)	
2016	Oxford	Oxford 9.4 (58) d. Cambridge 7.10 (52)	
2017	Oxford	Oxford 12.8 (80) d. Cambridge 4.4 (28)	
2018	Cambridge	Cambridge 4.10 (34) d. Oxford 4.4 (28)	
2019	Oxford	Oxford 8.8 (56) d. Cambridge 4.6 (30)	
2020	Cambridge	Cambridge 13.8 (86) d. Oxford 8.9 (57)	
2021	Cambridge	Cambridge 10.20 (80) d. Oxford 10.13 (73)	
2022	Oxford	Oxford (59) d. Cambridge (49)	
2023	Oxford	Oxford 9.13 (67) d. Cambridge 0.2 (2)	
2024	Cambridge	Cambridge 9.5 (59) d. Oxford 3.3 (21)	
2025	Oxford	Oxford (83) d. Cambridge (56)	
2026	Oxford	Oxford 10.7 (67) d. Cambridge 5.5 (35)	

=== Women's ===
Year	Winner	Results	Notes
2018	Tie	Oxford 1.1 (7) drew with Cambridge 1.1 (7)	First tie in Australian rules football Varsity history.
2022	Oxford	Oxford (43) d. Cambridge (34)	
2024	Oxford	Oxford (49) d. Cambridge (1)	
2025	Cambridge	Cambridge (59) d. Oxford (8)	
2026	Oxford	Oxford 16.17 (113) d. Cambridge 6.0 (6)	
