= Oxford University Australian Rules Football Club =

UK association football club

Oxford University Australian Rules Football Club (often referred to as OUARFC) is an Australian rules football club representing the University of Oxford in the United Kingdom and playing in the AFL England National University League. The club operates under the auspices of the Oxford University Sport Federation.

It is the oldest Australian rules football club outside of Australia It participates in the longest running fixture in the sport outside of Australia, the Oxford-Cambridge Varsity match and is the most successful European university club in the sport.

== History ==
The club was founded in 1906 by Prescott Harper, a Rhodes Scholar (Oriel & Western Australia, 1905). The team was initially made up primarily of Rhodes Scholars from Australia and South Africa. The first match against a University of Cambridge team took place on 18 March 1911, in Oxford. The Oxford team was captained by Alfred Clemes, also a Rhodes scholar (Magdalen & Tasmania, 1908). The game was won by Oxford. There is no known record of other games against Cambridge until 1921, when the regular Varsity fixture commenced with the Cambridge University Australian Rules Football Club. The Varsity Match has continued without any missed fixtures through until 2020. This history makes the AFL Oxford v Cambridge Varsity Match one of the oldest varsity matches, and an early example of the spread of Australian rules football around the world.

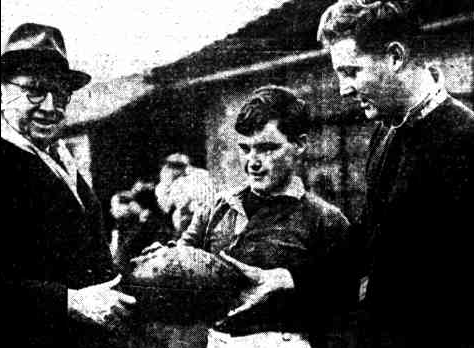
Australia's High Commissioner in London with the captains of the Oxford and Cambridge teams in 1949

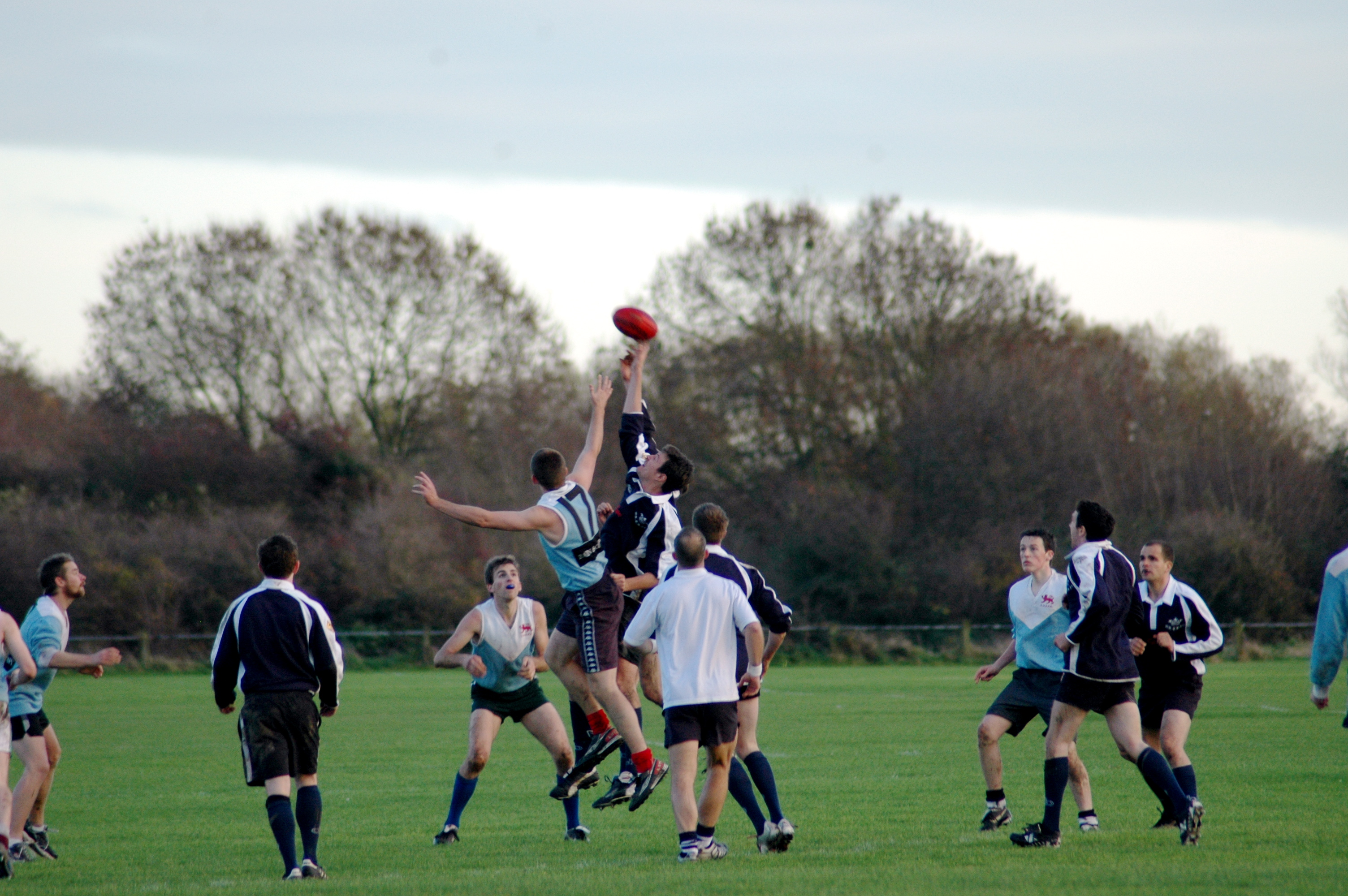
Oxford against Cambridge circa 2008

Women played their first game in OUARFC colours in February 2015, and in 2018 Romy Minko was elected as the club's first female president.

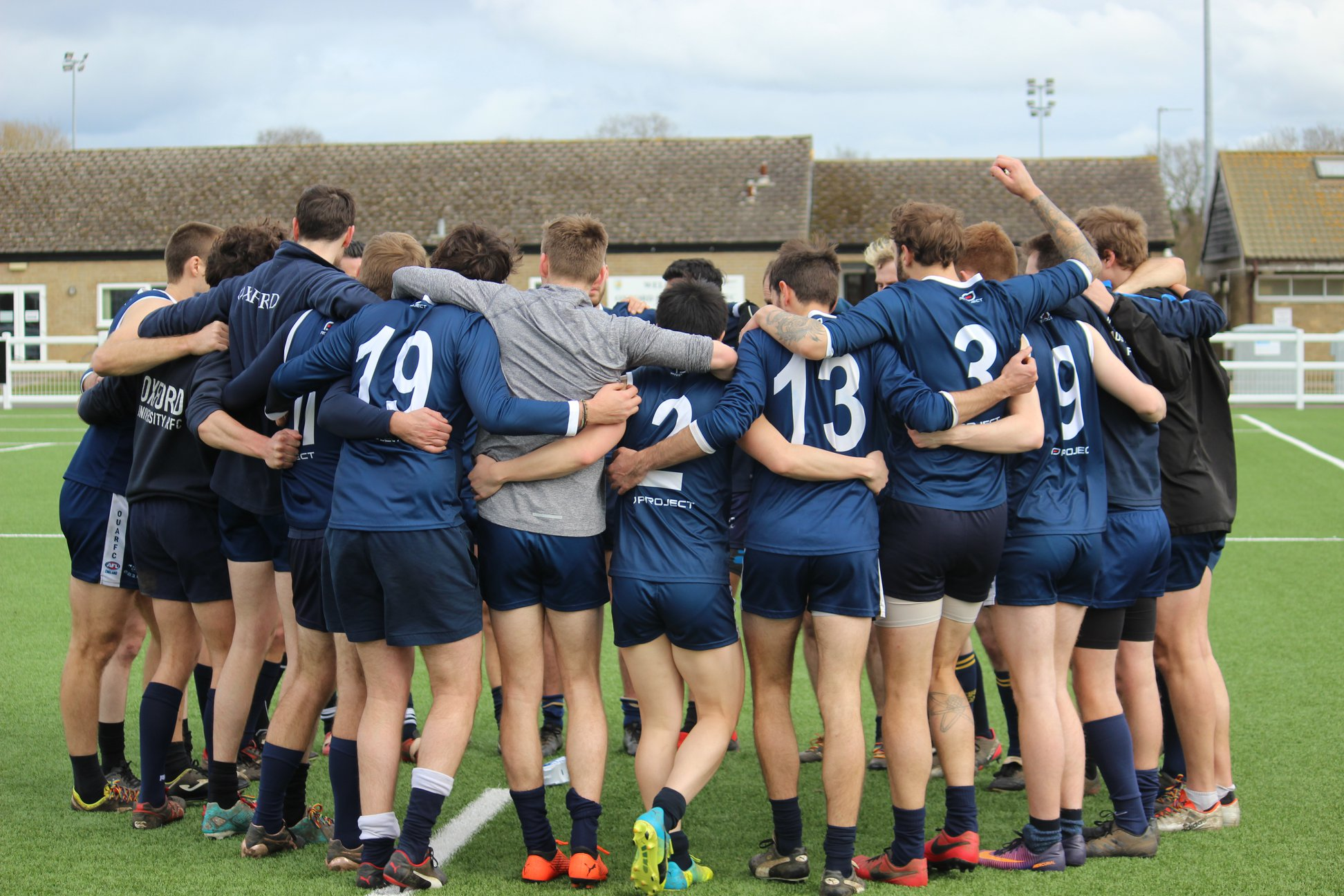
OUARFC Men's team at the 2020 Varsity Match played in Oxford

The club has participated in the National University League of AFL England since its inception in 2018. Teams within this league include the University of Cambridge, University of Birmingham and a combined team of players from Universities of South Wales. The club also plays occasional games against teams from around the Europe and the UK including the Amsterdam Devils and the Odense Lions.

== Team composition and notable players ==
Players have included notable Australians such as Judges of the Supreme Court of Victoria Chris Maxwell and Joseph Santamaria, the prominent businessman Sir Rod Eddington, mining executive Andrew Michelmore, and former AFL Commission Chairman and former Carlton Football Club captain Mike Fitzpatrick.

The team often included multiple Rhodes Scholars, and Sir John Monash Scholars, while both teams also often attract an influx of rugby league and rugby union players of Australian heritage. While completing a PhD in Engineering as a Rhodes Scholar, Justin Clarke coached both the women and men's sides.

Players from Ireland and Canada have become common as the sport's reach extends internationally, and due to the similarity of the game with Gaelic Football.

== See also ==
AFL Europe

- Australian Rules Football in Europe
- Australian Rules Football in England
