= Cambridge University Australian Rules Football Club =

Student sports club at Cambridge University

Cambridge University Australian Rules Football Club (CUARFC, also known as the Lions), founded in the early 20th century, is the Australian rules football club for Cambridge University. Both men's and women's teams represent the club in the National University League, the Fitzpatrick Cup, and the annual Oxford-Cambridge Varsity match, among other things.

== History ==
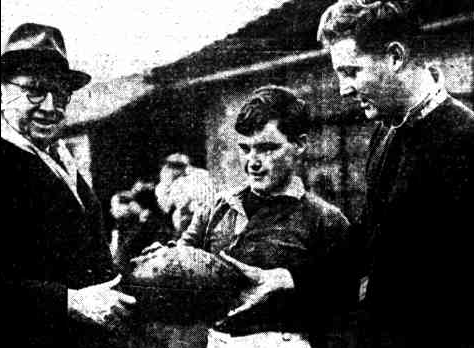
Australia's High Commissioner in London with the captains of the Oxford and Cambridge teams in 1949

The club has been active for over 100 years, with the first recorded men's game against Oxford taking place on March 18, 1911. The women's game has developed more recently, with the first women's varsity match in 2018 ending in a tie.

The 90th Varsity match was the subject of a short ABC documentary.

The connection between the university and the sport in fact stretches much further back to when Tom Wills, one of the founders of the game, studied there (seemingly to be more concerned about playing cricket than academics), then returning to Australia to set up the Melbourne Football Club.

== Membership & organisation ==
Membership of the club is not restricted to Cambridge University students or staff, although a significant proportion of the club would fall into these groups. The club naturally has a large Australian membership, as well as many Irish players, due to the similarity of the game to Gaelic football.

Players have a wide range of sporting backgrounds, ranging from having not played much sport at all, to having played Australian rules previously for a large part of their lives.

The club is managed by a committee, elected annually, consisting of the President, Treasurer, and other responsible people.

The club also has strong ties with the North London Lions, and a handful of players have ended up playing for both teams.

== See also ==
AFL Europe

Australian Rules Football in Europe

Australian Rules Football in the United Kingdom
