= Perry Bartlett =

Australian neuroscientist

Perry Bartlett AO FAA
- Born: Perry Francis Bartlett
- Education: University of Melbourne
- Known for: Prediction and isolation of brain stem cells
- Awards: Fellow of the Australian Academy of Science (2003); Australian Neuroscience Society Distinguished Achievement Award (2014); Florey Medal (2015); Research Australia’s Lifetime Achievement Award (2015); Queensland Greats Award (2016); Queensland Senior Australian of the Year (2017); Officer of the Order of Australia (2020)
- Scientific career
- Fields: Neuroscience
- Workplaces: Walter and Eliza Hall Institute, University of Queensland
- Doctoral students: Linda Richards

Perry Francis Bartlett AO FAA is an Australian neuroscientist. He was awarded the Florey Medal in 2015.

Bartlett first completed studies in dentistry. He later discovered he was more interested in research into the way the brain and immune system work. He went to Johns Hopkins University then University College London before returning to Melbourne.

Bartlett worked at the Walter and Eliza Hall Institute of Medical Research from 1978 until 2003, rising to the level of head of the division of Development and Neurobiology. In that time, he predicted the existence of stem cells in the brain in 1982. By 1992, he had identified them in mouse embryos then adult mice, and later isolated them in the forebrain. He was recognised for this work by being elected as a Fellow of the Australian Academy of Science in 2003.

Bartlett was the inaugural director of the Queensland Brain Institute from 2003 until 2015. He was the foundation professor of molecular neuroscience at the University of Queensland from 2002 and became emeritus professor in 2019.

He was recognised for his work in neuroscience research in the 2020 Queen's Birthday Honours.
