= Albert Hertel =

German painter

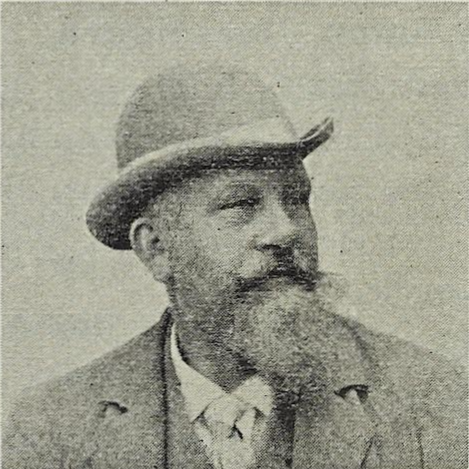
Albert Hertel (1897)

Albert Hertel (19 April 1843 – 12 February 1912) was a German landscape painter. He was born and died in Berlin.

== Life and work ==
He began his studies at the Berlin University of the Arts. At the age of twenty, he went to Rome and stayed there for almost four years. In addition to studying the masters, he became interested in landscape painting and took lessons from Heinrich Dreber.

In 1867, he returned to Berlin. He was only there for a year, however, then went to study at the Kunstakademie Düsseldorf with Oswald Achenbach, a well known landscape painter. In 1875, he was appointed a lecturer at the Berliner Kunstakademie, and placed in charge of the landscape painting studio. After two years there, he began working as a free-lance artist.

In addition to his landscapes, which he usually painted "en plein air", he created still-lifes and some genre pieces. He also did a few illustrations; for some tragedies by Sophocles, small dioramas of Bad Gastein, and a cycle of six Italian scenes.

In 1897, he was awarded a small gold medal at the Große Berliner Kunstausstellung. In 1902, he presented draft designs for thirteen paintings in tempera, to adorn the Imperial Staircase at Berlin Cathedral. There were nine square murals depicting the life of Jesus, and four oval ceiling panels on Biblical parables. They were approved by Kaiser Wilhelm II, and completed shortly before the Cathedral's opening in 1905.

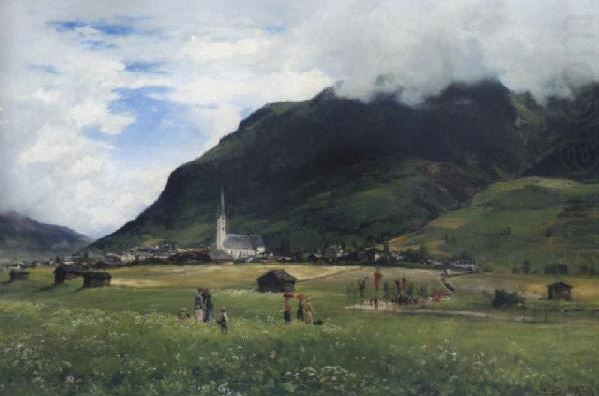
Procession to the Church in Bad Hofgastein

He died at the age of sixty-eight. His grave at the Cemetery of the Jerusalem and New Church Congregation has not been preserved.
