= Australian Quarterly =

- Discipline: Political science
- Language: English

Publication details
- History: 1929–present
- Publisher: Australian Institute of Policy and Science (Australia)
- Frequency: Bimonthly (1997–present); Quarterly (1929–1997)

Standard abbreviations
- ISO 4: Aust. Q.

Indexing
- ISSN: 0005-0091 (print); 1837-1892 (web)
- LCCN: sf86001017
- JSTOR: 00050091
- OCLC no.: 1518860

Links
- Journal homepage

Australian Quarterly is Australia's longest running political science journal, established in 1929. Its original focus on science policy quickly broadened to encompass a wide range of political, economic, and social issues. From 1929 to mid-1997 the journal was published quarterly. In the latter part of 1997 it switched to a magazine format, changed its name to AQ: Journal of Contemporary Analysis, and began appearing bimonthly. In 2006 it changed its name again to AQ: Australian Quarterly, which it remains; it continues to appear bimonthly.

AQ: Australian Quarterly is published in Sydney, Australia by the Australian Institute of Policy and Science, formerly known as the Australian Institute of Political Science. It is a core journal in the Worldwide Political Science Abstracts database, and issues more than three years old are available online through JSTOR.
