= Florey Medal =

Australian award for biomedical research

- Description: Significant lifetime achievements in biomedical science and human health advancement
- Sponsored by: CSL Limited
- Country: Australia
- Presented by: Australian Institute of Policy & Science (AIPS)
- Reward: A$50,000
- Website: aips.org.au/florey-award/the-florey-medal/

The Florey Medal, also known as the CSL Florey Medal and the Florey Medal for Lifetime Achievement, is an Australian award for biomedical research named in honour of Australian Nobel Laureate Howard Florey. The medal is awarded biennially and the recipient receives $50,000 in prize money.

The Medal was first awarded in 1998, the centenary of Florey's birth. It is administered by the Australian Institute of Policy & Science and has been sponsored by F H Faulding, then Mayne (when they took over Fauldings), Merck Sharp & Dohme, and is currently sponsored by CSL Limited.

== Recipients ==
Past recipients include:

- 1998 – Barry Marshall and Robin Warren for their work on Helicobacter pylori and its role in gastritis and peptic ulcer disease
- 2000 – Jacques Miller for work on the function of the thymus
- 2002 – Colin L. Masters for Alzheimer's disease research
- 2004 – Peter Colman for structural biology research
- 2006 – Ian Frazer for development of the cervical cancer vaccine Gardasil
- 2009 – John Hopwood for research and clinical application in lysosomal disorders
- 2011 – Graeme Clark for his invention of the bionic ear
- 2013 – Ruth Bishop for her work on understanding the rotavirus and the creation of a vaccine
- 2015 – Perry Bartlett for his discoveries that have transformed our understanding of the brain
- 2017 – Elizabeth Rakoczy from the Lions Eye Institute at the University of Western Australia for her work on a new gene therapy for wet age-related macular degeneration.
- 2019 – David Vaux and Andreas Strasser of the Walter and Eliza Hall Institute for their work on revealing the links between cell death and cancer.
- 2021 – Alan Cowman for uncoverering how the malaria parasite Plasmodium falciparum causes disease in humans.

== See also ==
- List of biomedical science awards
- List of awards named after people
