= Elizabeth Rakoczy =

Hungarian-born molecular ophthalmologist

Elizabeth P. Rakoczy (née Piroska E. Szepessy) is a Hungarian-born molecular ophthalmologist. She is a Emerita Professor at the University of Western Australia. She started the molecular ophthalmology department at the Lions Eye Institute. In 2017, Rakoczy was awarded the Florey Medal for her human gene therapy trial to modify viruses for the treatment of wet age-related macular degeneration.

== Career ==
Rakoczy was born is Miskolc, Hungary. She started the Department of Molecular Ophthalmology at the Lions Eye Institute and Professor of Molecular Ophthalmology at the University of Western Australia. She was the Research Director of the Lions Eye Institute and the Centre of Ophthalmology and Visual Sciences between 1999-2009. Rakoczy's research focuses on gene therapy and animal model development. Her laboratory developed and sold the ’Kimba’ and ‘Akimba’ mouse models for advanced retinal neovascularization. She pioneered secretion gene therapy or ‘biofactory’ for the treatment of wet age related macular degeneration. In 2011 it was licensed to Avalanche Biotechnologies Inc., (now Adverum Biotechnologies), which used the technology to raise ~$300 Million. Rakoczy has published more than 180 scientific papers in academic journals and several patents.

== Awards and honors ==
Rakoczy was a Bede Morris fellow of the Australian Academy of Science in 1998 and the National Health and Medical Research Council of Australia ‘Ten of the Best’ award winner in 2005 and winner of the CSL Florey Medal in 2017 for her human gene therapy trial modifying viruses to treat wet age-related macular degeneration.

== Personal life ==
She is married and has two children.
