= Marie von Bunsen =

British born German author and painter (1860–1941)

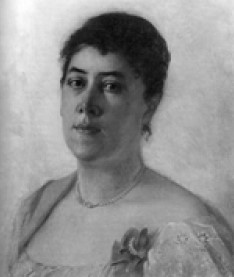
- Portrait of von Bunsen by Anne Jaeger (1897)
- Born: 17 January 1860; London, United Kingdom
- Died: 28 June 1941 (aged 81); Berlin, Germany
- Occupations: Artist, Writer
- Relatives: Christian Charles Josias von Bunsen (grandfather)

Marie von Bunsen (17 January 1860 – 28 June 1941) was a British-born German writer, watercolour painter and literary salon host.

== Life ==
Marie was born in London, United Kingdom, to a wealthy, liberal family. Her father was a Prussian politician and member of the Reichstag, Georg von Bunsen (1824–1896), while her mother, Emma von Birkbeck, came from a wealthy British banking family. The financial situation and social position of her family made it possible for her to spend extended periods time traveling abroad. In her youth she traveled in England, Italy and North Africa. She painted watercolours and from 1882 to 1927 she was a member of the Verein der Berliner Künstlerinnen (Association of Berlin Women Artists). She was for a time lady-in-waiting to Empress Victoria, but this ended when Emperor Friedrich III died in 1888.

In her house in the Tiergarten district of Berlin she received guests for Sunday breakfasts, and from 1905 onwards she organised a salon together with Hedwig Heyl and Else Schulhoff. She often travelled in Germany with her friends or alone. Between 1911 and 1914 she visited several countries in Asia and in 1934 she published Im Fernen Osten ('In the Far East') about her travels.

She also published biographies of members of royalty and of art critic John Ruskin (1903). In 1918 she joined the liberal German Democratic Party. She was financially independent until the hyperinflation of 1923 and afterwards earned her living by writing and painting. In 1930 Harper and Brothers published her Lost courts of Europe: The world I used to know, 1860-1912. She died on 28 June 1941 in Berlin.

== Selected works ==
Marie von Bunsen produced a total of 66 works in 209 publications in 2 languages and has 1,020 library holdings. These are some of her most well-known works:

=== Travel ===
- Udo in England. Eine Reiseerzählung (with Heinrich Hübner). Krabbe, Stuttgart, c. 1900.
- Sizilien. Geschichte, Kunst, Kultur. Ein Begleitbuch. Meyer & Jessen, Berlin 1910. ['Sicily. History, art, culture. A companion book']. Meyer & Jessen, Berlin 1910.
- Im Ruderboot durch Deutschland. ['In a rowing boat through Germany']. Havel, Werra, Weser und Oder. 1914.
- Von kühlen Wassern, Rohr und Schilf: Eine Ruderboot-Erzählung. ['Of cool waters, reeds and rushes: A rowing boat narrative']. Holzwarth, Bad Rothenfelde. 1926.
- Wanderungen durch Deutschland: Eindrücke und Bilder aus meiner Skizzenmappe. ['Hiking through Germany: Impressions and pictures from my sketchbook']. Hase & Koehler, Leipzig 1936
- Im fernen Osten. Eindrücke und Bilder aus Japan, Korea, China, Ceylon, Java, Siam, Kambodscha, Birma und Indien. ['In the Far East. Impressions and pictures from Japan, Korea, China, Ceylon, Java, Siam, Cambodia, Burma and India']. Koehler & Amelang, Leipzig 1934.

=== Biography and historical biography ===
- A biography of her father: Georg von Bunsen. Ein Charakterbild aus dem Lage der Besiegten gezeichnet von seiner Tochter. ['Georg von Bunsen, a character portrait from the camp of the vanquished, drawn by his daughter']. Hertz, Berlin 1900.
- John Ruskin. Sein Leben und sein Wirken Eine kritische Studie. ['John Ruskin. His Life and Work: A Critical Study']. Seemann, Leipzig 1903
- Talleyrands Nichte, die Herzogin von Sagan ['Talleyrand's niece, the Duchess of Sagan']. Deutsche Verlagsanstalt, Stuttgart 1935.
- Kaiserin Augusta ['Empress Augusta'] Siegismund, Berlin 1940.
- Maria Tudor. Das Lebensschicksal einer englischen Königin, 1516–1558. Siegismund, Berlin 1941.

=== Memoir and commentary ===
- Gegen den Strom. Ein Stimmungsbild aus dem neuen Berlin. ['Against the tide. A picture of the mood from the new Berlin']. Paetel Brothers, Berlin 1893. Appeared in English as:
  - A Winter in Berlin. Translated by Blanche Balfour Dugdale. Edward Arnold, London 1899.
- "Unsere letzte gesellige Blüte". ['Our last flowering of conviviality'], In: Emmy Wolff (ed.), Frauengenerationen in Bildern ['Generations of women in pictures']. Berlin 1928, pp. 99–107.
- Die Welt, in der ich lebte, Erinnerungen aus glücklichen Jahren, 1860–1912 (lit. 'The world I lived in, memories from happy years, 1860–1912'), Koehler & Amelang 1929. Published in English as:
  - Lost courts of Europe: The world I used to know, 1860-1912. edited and translated by Oakley Williams. New York and London: Harper & Brothers. 1930.
- Zeitgenossen, die ich erlebte. 1900–1930. ['Contemporaries I saw'. 1900–1930']. Koehler & Amelang, Leipzig 1932.
- Articles and reviews in a number of periodicals, including:
  - the political journal, Die Zukunft
  - the literary and scientific journal, Deutsche Rundschau
  - the literary magazines, Nord und Süd and Die Neue Rundschau
  - and the nationally distributed Berlin newspaper, Vossische Zeitung
