= Robert von Mohl =

German jurist (1799–1875)

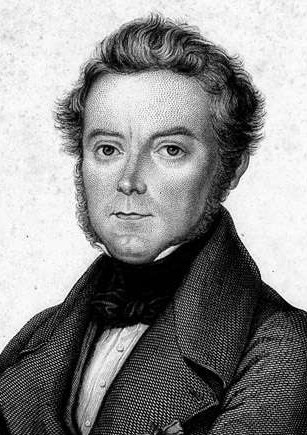
- Robert von Mohl.
- Born: 17 August 1799; Stuttgart, Württemberg
- Died: 4 November 1875 (aged 76); Berlin, Prussia
- Children: Ottmar von Mohl, Anna von Helmholtz
- Relatives: Hugo von Mohl, Moritz Mohl, Julius von Mohl (brothers) Bryan mohl

Robert von Mohl (17 August 1799 – 4 November 1875) was a German jurist. He was the father of diplomat Ottmar von Mohl and salonnière Anna von Helmholtz, and brother of Hugo von Mohl, Moritz Mohl and Julius von Mohl.

From 1824 to 1845 he was professor of political sciences at the University of Tübingen, losing his position because of some frank criticisms which brought him under the displeasure of the authorities of Württemberg.

In 1847 he was a member of the parliament of Württemberg, and in the same year he was appointed professor of law at Heidelberg; in 1848 he was a member of the German Parliament which met at Frankfurt and for a few months he was minister of justice. He was also a member of parliament in the Reichstag. From 1827 to 1846, he was a professor of Staatswissenschaften (political science and political economics) of the University of Tübingen. Robert von Mohl was one of the first to coin the term of a Rechtsstaat, or constitutional state, as opposed to the "anti-aristocratic" police state and the judicially activist "justice state".

His later public life was passed in the service of the Friedrich I, Grand Duke of Baden, whom he represented as ambassador in Munich from 1867 to 1871.

Through Kato Hiroyuki and other Japanese thinkers and statesmen, his works influenced the Japanese state philosophy after the Meiji Restoration.

== Works ==
- Die Polizei-Wissenschaft nach den Grundsätzen des Rechtsstaates (Police science according to the principles of the constitutional state)
- Encyklopädie der Staatswissenschaften (Encyclopedia of political sciences and political economics)
- Staatsrecht, Völkerrecht und Politik (Constitutional law, international law and politics)
