= Ottmar von Mohl =

German diplomat (1846–1922)

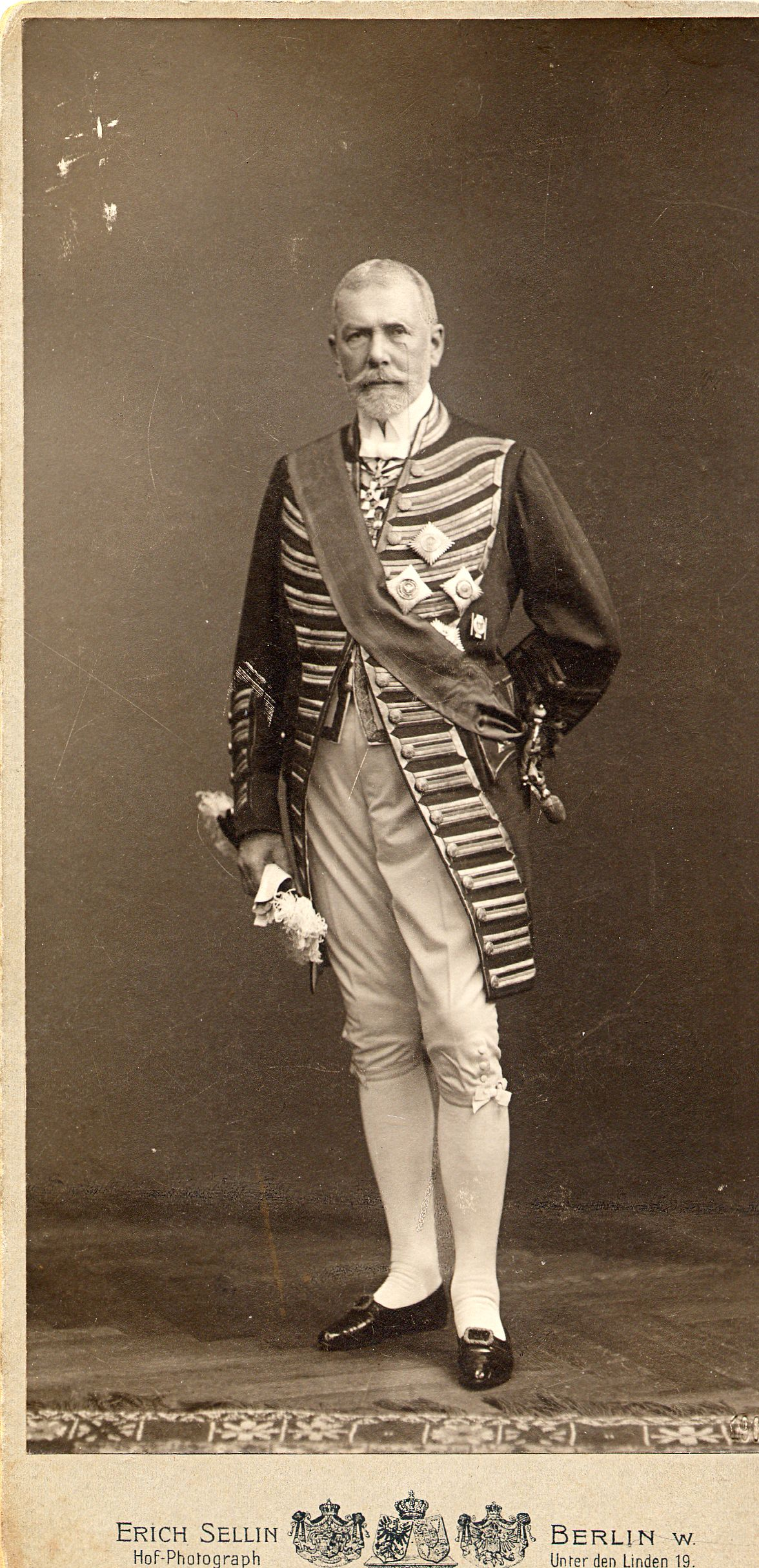
- Ottmar von Mohl
- Born: January 17, 1846; Tübingen, Kingdom of Württemberg, German Confederation
- Died: March 23, 1922 (aged 76); Neustadt an der Orla, German Reich
- Occupation: Legal scholar
- Known for: Foreign advisor to Meiji Japan
- Spouse(s): Wanda von Mohl, Countess von der Groeben
- Father: Robert von Mohl
- Relatives: Hugo von Mohl (uncle); Julius von Mohl (uncle)

Ottmar von Mohl (17 January 1846 – 23 March 1922) was a German diplomat and government adviser in Meiji period Japan.

Ottmar von Mohl, born in Tübingen, Germany was the son of famous jurist Robert von Mohl. He studied law at the University of Tübingen, passed the first Baden State Examination in 1868 and earned a doctorate in law from the University of Heidelberg the same year. In 1873, he was appointed cabinet secretary of Empress Augusta of Saxe-Weimar.

His diplomatic career led him to Cincinnati, Ohio, in the United States in 1879 and to Saint Petersburg, Russia, in 1885 as German consul.

He was recruited by the Meiji period Japanese government as a foreign adviser from 1887 to 1889. He and his wife, Wanda von Mohl (née Countess von der Groeben), served with the Japanese Imperial Household Ministry in Tokyo, Japan, to introduce European Court ceremonials and protocols to Japanese Emperor Meiji and his court.

From 1897 to 1917, he served as a German delegate to the Egyptian National Debt Commission in Cairo, until the activities of that Commission were suspended in 1914 due to the Egyptian Declaration of War.

He died at Schloss Arnshaugk near Neustadt an der Orla.

== Works ==
- Wanderungen durch Spanien (Wanderings through Spain). Leipzig: Duncker & Humblot 1878
- Am japanischen Hofe (At the Japanese Court). Berlin: Reimer 1904
- Lebenserinnerungen: 50 Jahre Reichsdienst (Autobiography: 50 years Service for the Empire). 2 volumes. Leipzig: List 1920/22 (Vol 2: Ägypten Egypt)
