= Justin Clarke =

Australian rules footballer

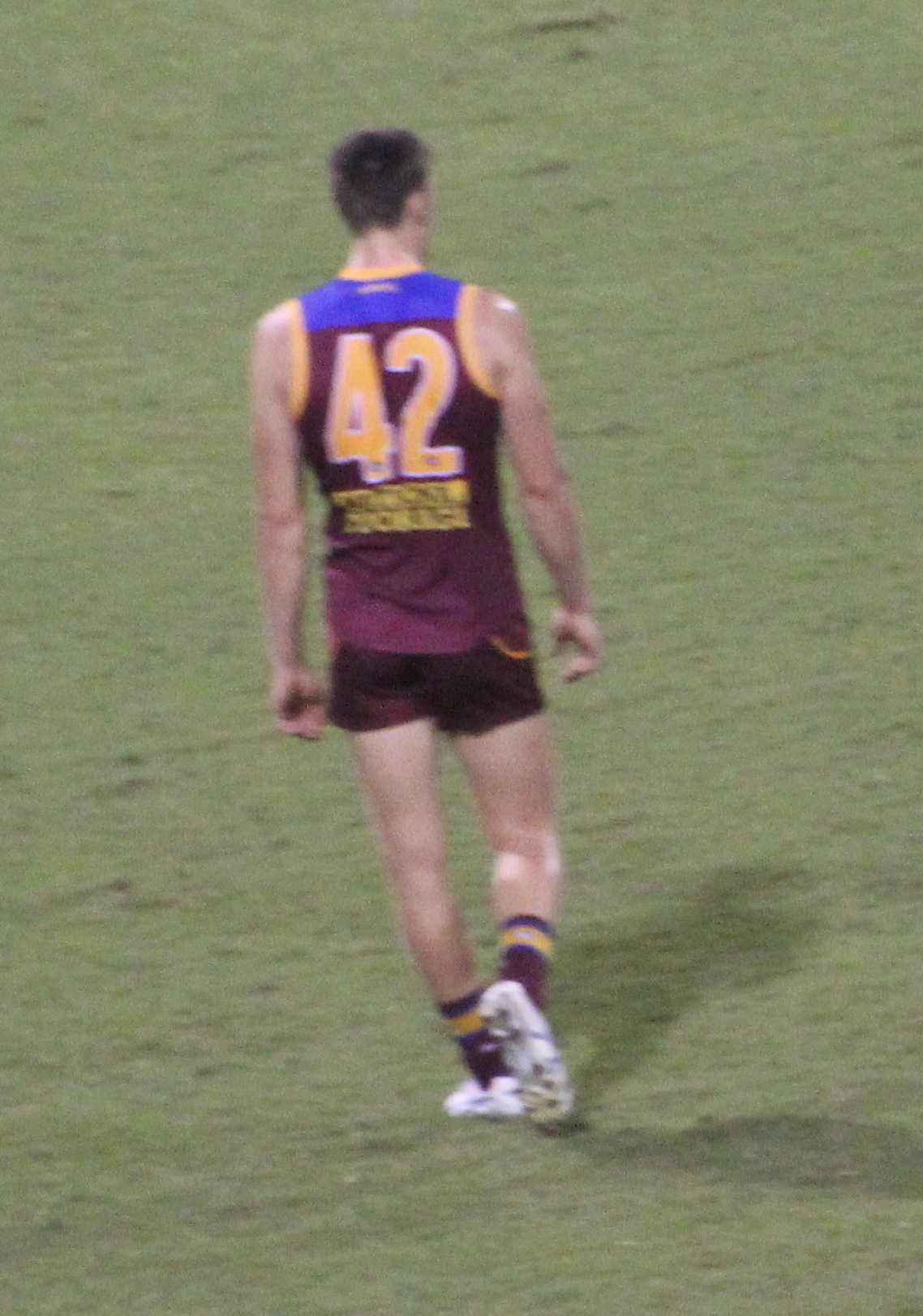
- Clarke at a game for the Lions against Richmond in April 2015

Personal information
- Full name: Justin Clarke
- Nicknames: Jason, Jase, Clarkey
- Born: 18 November 1993 (age 32)
- Original teams: Booleroo Centre/Melrose/Wilmington, (NAFA)
- Draft: No. 4, 2012 Rookie draft
- Height: 195 cm (6 ft 5 in)
- Weight: 95 kg (209 lb)

Playing career^{1}
Years	Club	Games (Goals)
2012–2016	Brisbane Lions	56 (1)
- ^{1} Playing statistics correct to the end of 2016.

Career highlights
- NEAFL premiership player: 2012

Justin Clarke (born 18 November 1993) is a former professional Australian rules footballer who played for Brisbane Lions in the Australian Football League (AFL) from 2012 to 2016. Clarke grew up in the small town of Booleroo Centre in the southern Flinders Ranges region of South Australia. Throughout his childhood Clarke had a strong interest in aviation, but his application to join the Air Force was denied as he was too tall. He completed high school with an ATAR of 99.95.

He was recruited from the Booleroo Centre/Melrose/Wilmington (BMW) Lions in the Northern Areas Football Association (NAFA) with the 4th selection in the 2012 Rookie draft. Clarke spent his first year at the Brisbane Lions on the rookie list and the three years following as a consistent member of the senior team's backline. Clarke announced his retirement on 31 March 2016 after suffering a severe concussion during a preseason training session. Multiple doctors had advised Clarke to completely abandon contact sport.

Since his retirement, Clarke has been involved as an ambassador for the Queensland Brain Institute, and has worked as an assistant coach at QAFL team Western Magpies. Upon graduating from The University of Queensland with a Bachelor of Engineering (Honours) (Mechanical and Aerospace Engineering) and a Bachelor of Science (Mathematics) he was selected as a Rhodes Scholar for 2021 and will complete a Doctor of Philosophy at Oxford University in Engineering Science.

== Early life ==
Clarke grew up on his family's farm just outside of Booleroo Centre, located in the southern Flinders Ranges region of South Australia. He attended Booleroo Centre District School, graduating in 2011. In 2009 he submitted an essay for the Premier's Anzac Spirit School Prize and was one of six students selected for a two-week trip to Europe, where he attended a number of ANZAC services, commemorations and memorials in Belgium, France and the United Kingdom. He was school vice president in his penultimate year of high school and SRC president in his final year. He achieved an ATAR of 99.95, the highest possible score.

Clarke had an interest in aviation from a young age. At the age of around 15, Clarke began studying aviation, and flew his first solo flight before obtaining his driver's licence. Clarke has described flying as providing an "awesome sense of freedom, being able to leave the bounds of the Earth". Clarke applied to be a pilot in the Air Force, and despite passing his aptitude tests, he was told he was too tall.

== Pre-AFL career ==
Clarke has stated that throughout his younger years he identified as more of an "academic person", and only began to seriously consider a career in the AFL at 18. Clarke's performances for his local club, Booleroo Centre/Melrose/Wilmington (BMW), impressed scouts at North Adelaide Football Club, who attempted to convince Clarke to move away from his family farm to play SANFL games in Adelaide. Clarke eventually played one game for North Adelaide in the SANFL reserves, before returning to Booleroo Centre to continue playing for his local club. His performance for North Adelaide attracted scouts from a number of clubs to the Northern Areas Football Association (NAFA) semi-final, in which Clarke and BMW faced Crystal Brook.

Clarke's performances in the NAFA drew comparison to Dustin Fletcher, due to Clarke's ability to maintain a low centre of gravity. North Adelaide coach Josh Francou noted Clarke's resilient attitude, stating that "he copped a whack in the face and got a blood nose but he just got on with it" after Clarke's first training session with the club.

== AFL career ==
=== 2012 ===
Clarke was selected by the Brisbane Lions at pick No. 4 in the 2012 Rookie Draft. He spent his first year on the Lions' rookie list, leaving him ineligible for senior games. His impressed his coaches enough to be able to secure a consistent spot in the backline of the reserves team, playing the most NEAFL games of any Lion that year. The Lions made the grand final, in which Clarke was tasked with marking Eastern Conference Team of the Year full forward James Kavanagh. Kavanagh scored only a single goal, with Clarke moving forward in the closing stages to kick a goal himself. The Brisbane Lions achieved a 75–144 victory over Queanbeyan and won the NEAFL championship, despite the Lions placing last the previous year.

=== 2013 ===
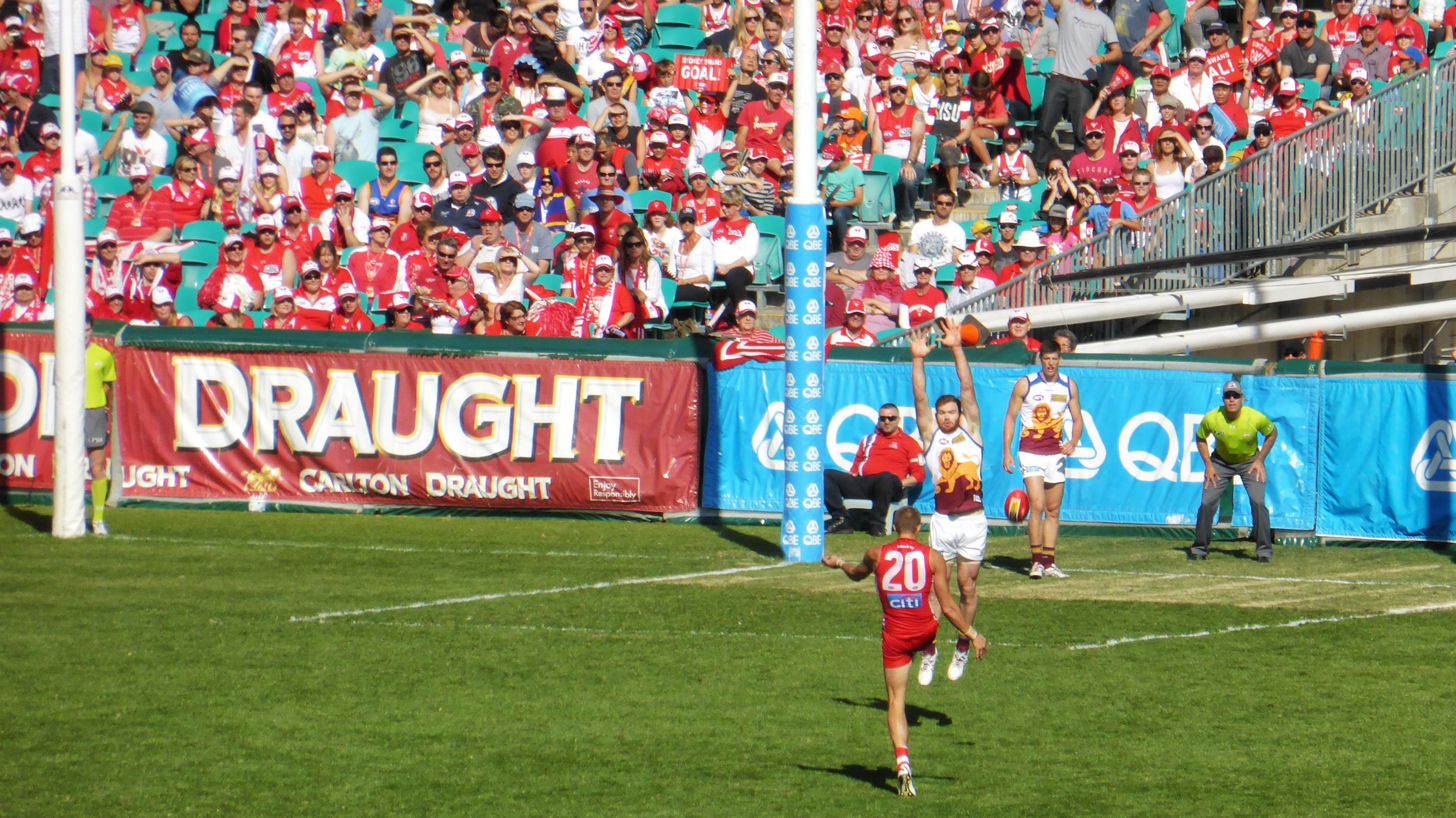
Justin Clarke and Daniel Merrett at the Sydney Cricket Ground in 2013 in a game against the Sydney Swans

After continuing to impress the Lions' coaches in his preseason games, Clarke was elevated to the Lions primary list, making him eligible for senior football with the Lions. He had 7 disposals in his round 5 debut, where the Brisbane Lions were victorious over Melbourne. In his third game, Clarke took 12 marks while obtaining what would become his career-high disposal count of 22. The Lions lost this game to West Coast. He held his place in the senior team until he was suspended for charging Essendon's Elliot Kavanagh, with Clarke arriving late to a marking contest. He missed the Lions' round 9 game against Carlton. He played in the famous Miracle on Grass against Geelong, in which the Brisbane Lions overcame a 52-point deficit to win after the siren. He made 8 disposals and led the Lions in one percenters, with 12. Clarke cited this game, and the final passage of play, as a standout memory in his AFL career in a "Message to Fans" upon his retirement. Clarke's season ended after a round 20 loss to Richmond, with a shoulder injury leaving him out of the team for the remainder of the year. Assistant coach at the Lions, Murray Davis, named Clarke as the standout performer of the developing Brisbane defence. Clarke signed a contract extension at the season's conclusion, keeping him at the Lions until at least the end of the 2016 season.

=== 2014 ===
Clarke played every Lions game of the 2014 season. He scored the first and only goal of his AFL career in round 4 against Port Adelaide, kicking from 55 metres (60 yd) out on the run. This was one of only 7 Lions' goals for the game, with Brisbane losing the game by 113 points. Clarke's reliability in the backline led to him consistently being tasked with shutting down the opponents' best forward, and allowed fellow defender Daniel Merrett to spend time up forward throughout the season. In the round 16 game against Richmond, Clarke was selected to mark two-time Coleman medalist Jack Riewoldt. Riewoldt scored two goals, while Clarke provided multiple defensive spoils and intercept marks, again obtaining the most one percenters of any player on the ground. Clarke was voted as the Lions' player of the round for his performance.

=== 2015 ===
Clarke continued to garner consistent selections in the Lions senior team, playing all but two games in 2015, missing rounds 20 and 21 as a result of a jaw injury. In rounds 7, 8, and 10, Clarke spent no time on the interchange bench, the only player to do so in all of these games. In the first 18 rounds, Clarke was conceding 2.36 goals every 120 minutes, while continuing to primarily play on the opponent's best forward. During the Lions' bye in round 11, Clarke took the week off as an opportunity to get reinvolved with his boyhood club, the Booleroo/Melrose/Wilmington Lions. Clarke spent that Saturday helping the country football club run their games, acting as the runner for one game and umpiring another. In his 56th and final game, Clarke overtook Tristan Lynch as the Lion with the most games played wearing the Number 42. Clarke placed 10th in the Merrett–Murray Medal for Brisbane Lions best and fairest, receiving 102 votes throughout the season.

== Statistics ==
Legend
G	Goals	K	Kicks	D	Disposals	T	Tackles
B	Behinds	H	Handballs	M	Marks

Season	Team	No.	Games	Totals							Averages (per game)						
Season	Team	No.	Games	G	B	K	H	D	M	T	G	B	K	H	D	M	T
2012	Brisbane Lions	42	—	—	—	—	—	—	—	—	—	—	—	—	—	—	—
2013	Brisbane Lions	42	14	0	0	87	63	150	64	15	0.0	0.0	6.2	4.5	10.7	4.6	1.1
2014	Brisbane Lions	42	22	1	0	119	106	225	88	34	0.0	0.0	5.4	4.8	10.2	4.0	1.5
2015	Brisbane Lions	42	20	0	2	119	99	218	92	25	0.0	0.1	6.0	5.0	10.9	4.6	1.3
2016	Brisbane Lions	42	—	—	—	—	—	—	—	—	—	—	—	—	—	—	—
Career			56	1	2	325	268	593	244	74	0.0	0.0	5.8	4.8	10.6	4.4	1.3

== Concussion ==
During a preseason training session on 18 January 2016, Clarke was left unconscious for fifteen seconds after a collision in training. His forehead collided just above the knee of an onrushing teammate, with Clarke falling towards the ground after being lightly shoved in a marking contest. He left the session in an ambulance, but was discharged from hospital that same night, after scans found no break or fractures to his neck. Clarke continued to suffer severe concussion symptoms, with the footballer having "lost all memory of the incident and the succeeding three weeks, as he was all but confined to his house". Symptoms persisted for months, with Clarke citing an incident where he found himself lost on his route to university as the most confronting, stating "I didn't know how to get there, and that scared me a lot".

=== Retirement ===
News broke on 16 February that Clarke had been ruled out of AFL inclusion indefinitely, with rumours of his forced retirement circulating a month later. On 31 March 2016, Clarke officially announced his retirement at the age of 22, concluding his AFL career with 56 games for the Brisbane Lions. Three separate specialists all gave recommendations for Clarke to permanently retire from all contact sport, citing a greatly increased susceptibility to any further head knocks. Clarke received a payout of $700,000 from the AFL as a result of the injury. He became the third Brisbane Lion to retire as a result of a concussion within 3 years, following Jonathan Brown and Matt Maguire. All three of these incidents still occurred after the AFL's tightening of concussion protocol, which forbid players from returning to a game after medical staff diagnose a concussion.

=== Ambassador ===
In 2017, Clarke became an ambassador of the University of Queensland's Queensland Brain Institute, where he worked to increase concussion awareness and research. Clarke has particularly stressed the importance of proper management of concussed athletes, noting the inaccuracy of concussion self-assessment. On his own injury, Clarke has stated "A player in that moment – whether it's for the best or not – they'll want to be back out there. I wanted to be back out there". Clarke has also emphasised the importance of concussion symptom awareness, and the importance of athletes understanding the risks of their sport of choice. In 2018, Clarke's forced retirement was featured in an episode of SBS TV's Insight entitled "Game Over", in which a number of athletes, including Clarke, described their difficulties in adjusting to life after elite sport. Other athletes featured in this episode include Barry Hall, Libby Trickett and Jana Pittman.

== Further sporting involvement ==
After being forbidden from playing contact sport, Clarke took up rowing, which he admitted was "a very different sport for a kid growing up in a farm three hours north of Adelaide, where there's not a lot of water". Clarke was a member of the winning Men's 8 team for the Queensland State Rowing Championship in 2017. He also returned to cricket, as a fast bowler for Surfers Paradise Cricket Club.

Despite Clarke's injury he maintained a passion for Aussie Rules, Clarke noting the inevitability of knocks as "part and parcel of the game that we love". After his injury, Clarke struggled to be around football clubs, stating that "I would enjoy it while I was there, but then I would head home and think about how they were all doing something that I would really love to be doing". He later joined QAFL team Western Magpies as an assistant coach, where he primarily focused on developing key position players in their knowledge of the game. Clarke also coached the players in correct body positioning during aerial ball contests.

Soon after Clarke arrived in Oxford to read his DPhil in late 2021, it was announced that he had been appointed Head Women's Coach of the Oxford University Australian Rules Football Club (OUARFC) for the 2021/2022 season. OUARFC is the oldest AFL Club outside of Australia.

In June 2022, Clarke led the Magdalen ‘Badgers’ cricket team to their first Cuppers win in over two decades. Since arriving at Oxford, Clarke has rowed in Magdalen College Boat Club's first boat in both Torpids and Summer Eights.

== Education ==
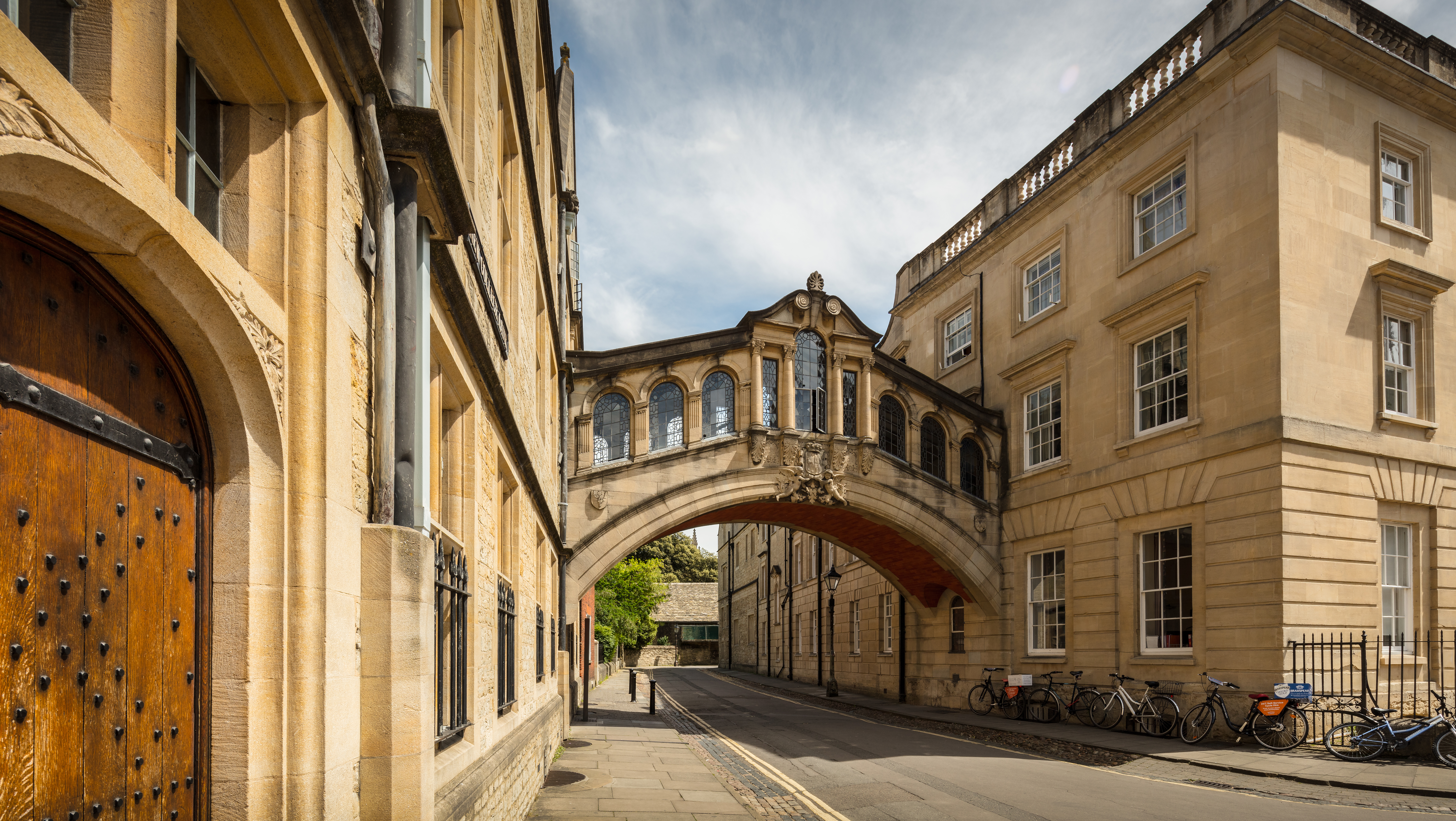
University of Oxford, where Clarke will be undertaking his doctorate

During his time at the Brisbane Lions, Clarke studied a Bachelor of Electrical Engineering, attending university part-time. After the severe concussion ended his footballing career, Clarke made a gradual return to full-time university, and began studying aerospace engineering at the University of Queensland in 2016.

During his time at the University of Queensland he received multiple Dean's Commendations for Academic Excellence and completed a Bachelor of Engineering (Honours) (Mechanical and Aerospace Engineering) and a Bachelor of Science (Mathematics) in 2020. Clarke was selected as a 2021 Rhodes Scholar and will begin his study at Oxford University in October 2021. At Magdalen College, he formed an integral part of the cricket team ("The Badgers"), helping them to Cuppers glory in 2022.

Clarke plans to undertake a Doctor of Philosophy Engineering Science at the University of Oxford, where he will be modelling hypersonic pulse tunnels at Oxford's Thermofluids Institute.
