= Heinrich Dreber =

German painter

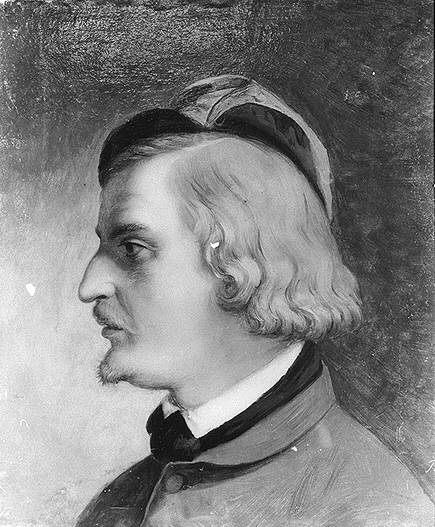
Portrait of Dreber by Georg Friedrich Bolte, 1849, now in the Alte Nationalgalerie in Berlin

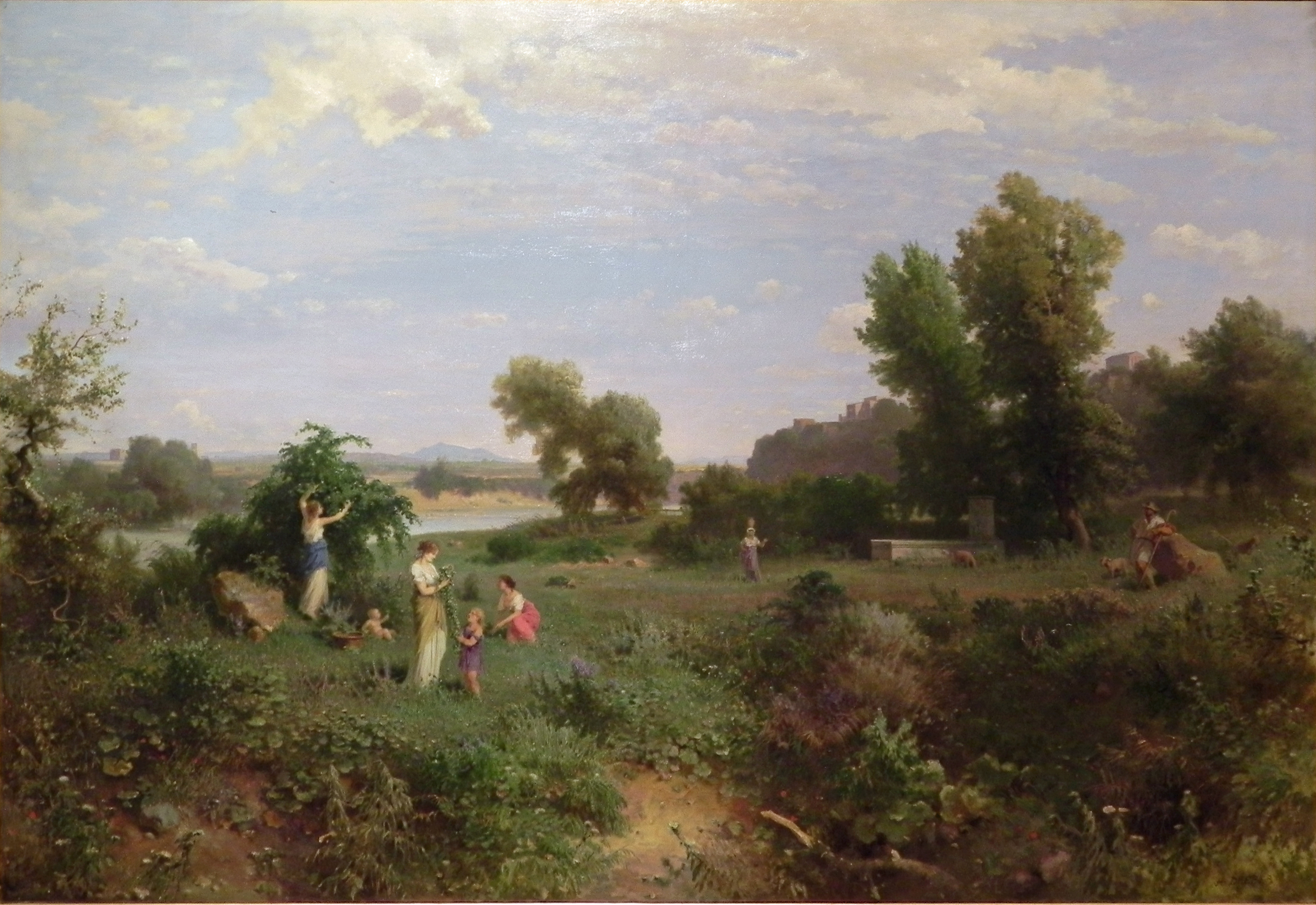
View of the Tiber, early Summer, 1872, now in the Lower Saxony State Museum

Heinrich Dreber, known as Franz-Dreber (9 January 1822, in Dresden – 3 August 1875, in Anticoli Corrado), was a German landscape painter.

== Biography ==
Living in the house of a relation whose name Franz he adopted, he frequented the Academy of his native city, and afterwards the studio of Ludwig Richter. After he had gained the gold medal, he resided for some time in Munich, and in the spring of 1843 went as exhibitioner of the Dresden Academy to Rome, where he became a member of the Academy of St. Luke, and spent almost the entire remainder of his life. His study of Italian nature had the greatest influence on his works, and at the same time the impression made upon him by modern French landscape painters increased his desire to obtain a soft fusion of colours.

He died in Anticoli Corrado, near Rome, in 1875. His pictures, which were exhibited together in 1876 in the National Gallery at Berlin, are with few exceptions in the hands of private persons; there are two in the Berlin Gallery — a 'Landscape, with the Hunting of Diana,' and 'An Autumn Morning in the Sabine Mountains.'
