= Australian Institute of Policy and Science =

Australian nonprofit organization

The Australian Institute of Policy and Science (AIPS) is an Australian non-partisan and non-profit organisation that aims to further public understanding of the public policy and science in Australia. Founded in 1932 as the Australian Institute of Political Science during the Great Depression, the organisation's initial aim was focused on economic matters. In 2006 the organisation changed its name to the AIPS to better reflect its objectives and activities. AIPS receives funding from the Australian Government and state governments, universities and the corporate sector. AIPS currently has offices in New South Wales, Victoria and South Australia.

== The Tall Poppy Campaign ==
The Tall Poppy Campaign was initiated by AIPS in 1998 to recognise and celebrate Australian scientific and intellectual excellence. Annual Young Tall Poppy Science Awards are made to outstanding young Australian researchers across science, technology, engineering and mathematics (STEM) for their excellence in research as well as capacity and demonstrated commitment to communicate it to the broader community. Since 2010 the awards have been made across all states and territories including the ACT, New South Wales, the Northern Territory, Queensland, South Australia, Tasmania, Western Australia and Victoria. These 'Young Tall Poppies' go on to participate in a program of school visits and online interactions, educational seminars, policy workshops and community activities to foster a stronger interest in and understanding of science.

== AQ: Australian Quarterly ==
AQ: Australian Quarterly has been in publication since 1929 and is Australia's oldest continuous print current affairs journal. It focuses on where science can contribute to relevant contemporary political, social and economic matters relevant to Australia and its global context. The journal is published four times per year and targets a general informed readership. It is available in online archived format through JSTOR (back issues from three years before publication) and current issues online through RMIT.

== CSL Florey Medal ==
The CSL Florey Medal is an initiative of the Australian Institute of Policy & Science. Named after Australian Nobel Prize winner Howard Florey, the medal is awarded biennially to an Australian biomedical researcher for a milestone achievement in biomedical science and human health advancement. The most recent winner was Professor John Hopwood (2009) Professor John Hopwood and immediate past winner was Professor Ian Frazer.
