= Hedwig Heyl =

German businesswoman and author, c.1853–1934

Hedwig Heyl (c. 1853 - January 23, 1934) was a German businesswoman and author, active in social welfare causes.

Heyl was born in Bremen in 1850. Her father was the industrialist Edouard Crüsemann. She married Georg Heyl at age 18, and when she was widowed at age 49 she took over running the business—a very unusual thing for a woman to do at that time. She organized the National Women's Service League in Germany during World War I and set up soup kitchens around Berlin. She was the head of the 1904 International Women's Congress in Berlin. She organized an exhibition in Berlin called "Woman in Her Home and Occupational Life" in 1906. She was the author of a popular German cookbook, Das ABC der Küche (The ABCs of the Kitchen). In 1920 she received an honorary degree from the University of Berlin.

== Sources ==
- Benbow, Heather Merle; Perry, Heather R. (2019-11-18). Food, Culture and Identity in Germany's Century of War. Springer Nature. ISBN 978-3-030-27138-1.
- Braybon, Gail (2003). Evidence, History, and the Great War: Historians and the Impact of 1914-18. Berghahn Books. ISBN 978-1-57181-801-0.
