= Mary Elizabeth Mohl =

British writer (1793-1883)

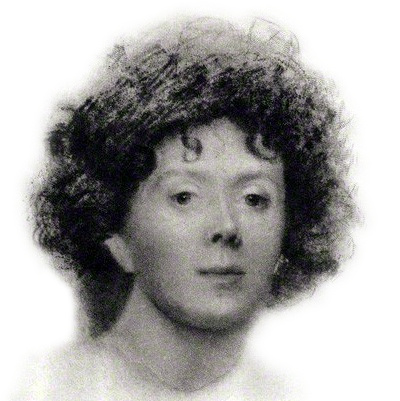
- Born: Mary Elizabeth Clarke; 22 February 1793 Westminster, England
- Died: 15 May 1883 (aged 90) Paris, France
- Resting place: Pere Lachaise cemetery, Paris
- Occupation: writer, salon hostess
- Spouse: Julius von Mohl (m. 1847; died 1876)

Mary Elizabeth Mohl or Mary Elizabeth Clarke (22 February 1793 – 15 May 1883) was a British writer who was known as a salon hostess in Paris. She was known by her nickname of "Clarkey". She was admired for her independence and conversation. She eventually married the orientalist Julius von Mohl. She was an ardent Francophile, a feminist, and a close friend of Florence Nightingale. She wrote about her interest in the history of women's rights.

== Life ==
Mary Elizabeth Clarke was born in Westminster in 1793. After the death of her father, Charles Clarke, Mary, at age 8, her mother, Elizabeth, and grandmother moved to France in 1801.

Both her guardians were strong and independent-minded women. Her Scottish grandmother had hobnobbed with thinkers like David Hume and Adam Smith in Edinburgh and before the French Revolution lived in Dunkirk. Mary's mother Elizabeth was a progressive free thinker.

Ties with England were not lost; in 1808 Mary's sister, Eleanor, married John Frewen-Turner, a member of parliament. Mary would frequently visit their home at Cold Overton in Leicestershire. Eventually, Mary's charm became almost universally admired, and as a result she had a number of notable suitors and important contacts in both France and England.

Mary was on very good terms with Madame Récamier, who was both the landlady of their sub-let accommodation at the Abbaye-aux-Bois, as well as a leader in French intellectual salon society. After the 1815 restoration of the Bourbon monarchy,

Mary Clarke came to know Juliette Recamier... Through her, she met literary greats such as Stendhal, Hugo, Prosper Merimee and Chateaubriand. Chateaubriand – author of Memoirs from Beyond the Grave – was by now a grumpy old man, but he cheered up when entertained by "la jeune anglaise".

In June 1822, Mary and her mother visited England and Scotland. One of her suitors, Claude Charles Fauriel, who had become a loyal friend, revealed his interest when he wrote to Mary concerning Auguste Sirey, who had been spoken of as Mary's fiancée. He was concerned as it had been proposed that Sirey would go to England with them. During her relationship with Claude Fauriel, she became acquainted with the family of the famous Italian writer and poet Alessandro Manzoni

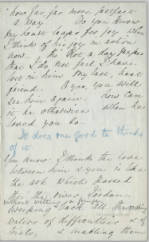
Letter from Florence Nightingale to Mohl in 1881

In 1838 she made her final move when she rented rooms above the writer and historian François-René de Chateaubriand. These were a third floor apartment at 120 Rue du Bac in the Saint-Germain district. There,"she offered a home-from-home" to William Thackeray, the Brownings, and the Trollopes, "as well as to many aristocrats, diplomats and politicians." For nearly forty years, the Clarke and later Mohl home was an intellectual centre in Paris.

About this time she was introduced to William Nightingale's family including his daughter Florence Nightingale. Florence Nightingale recorded that "Clarkey" was a stimulating hostess who did not care for her appearance and although her ideas might not always agree with her guests, "she was incapable of boring anyone." Her behaviour was said to be exasperating and eccentric, and she was clear that she had no respect for British women who she regarded generally as inconsequential. She said that if given the choice between being a woman or a galley slave then she would choose the freedom of the galleys. She generally avoided female company and spent her time with male intellectuals like Fauriel and Mohl.

However Clarkey made exceptions including George Eliot, Lady Augusta Stanley, Elizabeth Gaskell and Florence Nightingale in particular. She and Florence were to remain close friends for 40 years despite their 27-year age difference. Mohl demonstrated that women could be equals to men, an idea that Florence did not obtain from her mother.

In 1847, at around 54 years old, she married the orientalist Julius von Mohl who was the son of the prime minister to the king of Württemberg. It was said that someone coughed when she gave her age at the marriage and that it was recorded as 39. The groom was about 47.

Henry James described how

Madame Mohl used to drop out of an omnibus, often into a mud-puddle, at our door, and delight us with her originality and freshness. I can see her now, just arrived, her feet on the fender before the fire, her hair flying, and her general untidiness so marked as to be picturesque.

In 1854, Florence Nightingale set off with a team of women to assist in nursing the wounded men from the Crimean War in Scutari. Nightingale's studies had been assisted by Mary and her husband and they again assisted Nightingale when she travelled through Paris en route to the Crimea. Mary had other varying literary associations as well. A portion of Wives and Daughters was written by Elizabeth Gaskell whilst staying with Mohl. Mohl herself wrote Madame Récamier, with a Sketch of the History of Society in France, published in London in 1862. This book drew on her knowledge of Récamier, but it also outlined her interest in women and a history of their rights. She was a lifelong advocate for women and reading.

In 1870–71, Mohl decided to avoid France's war with Prussia, and spent the winter with friends in London. Having retired from being a hostess, Mohl died in Paris in 1883. She was buried with her husband in Paris in the Pere Lachaise cemetery.
