= Julius von Mohl =

German and French orientalist (1800–1876)

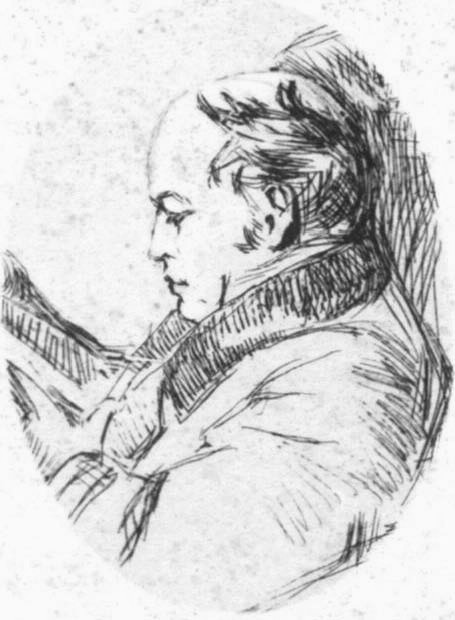
- Born: 25 October 1800; Stuttgart, Germany
- Died: 4 January 1876 (aged 75); Paris
- Resting place: Pere Lachaise cemetery, Paris
- Spouse: Mary Elizabeth Clarke (m. 1847)
- Relatives: Hugo von Mohl (brother); Robert von Mohl (brother); Ottmar von Mohl (nephew)

Julius von Mohl (25 October 1800 – 4 January 1876) was a German Orientalist.

== Life ==
The brother of Hugo von Mohl and Robert von Mohl, he was born at Stuttgart. He abandoned the idea of entering the Lutheran ministry, and in 1823 went to Paris, at that time, under Silvestre de Sacy, the major European school of Eastern letters. From 1826 to 1833 he was nominally professor at Tübingen, but had permission to continue his studies abroad, and passed some years in London and Oxford.

He resigned his chair at Tübingen in 1834, and settled permanently in Paris. In 1844 he was nominated to the Academy of Inscriptions, and in 1847 he became professor of Persian at the Collège de France. But his knowledge and interest extended to all departments of Oriental learning. He served for many years as secretary, and then as president of the Société Asiatique. He died in Paris on 3 January 1876.

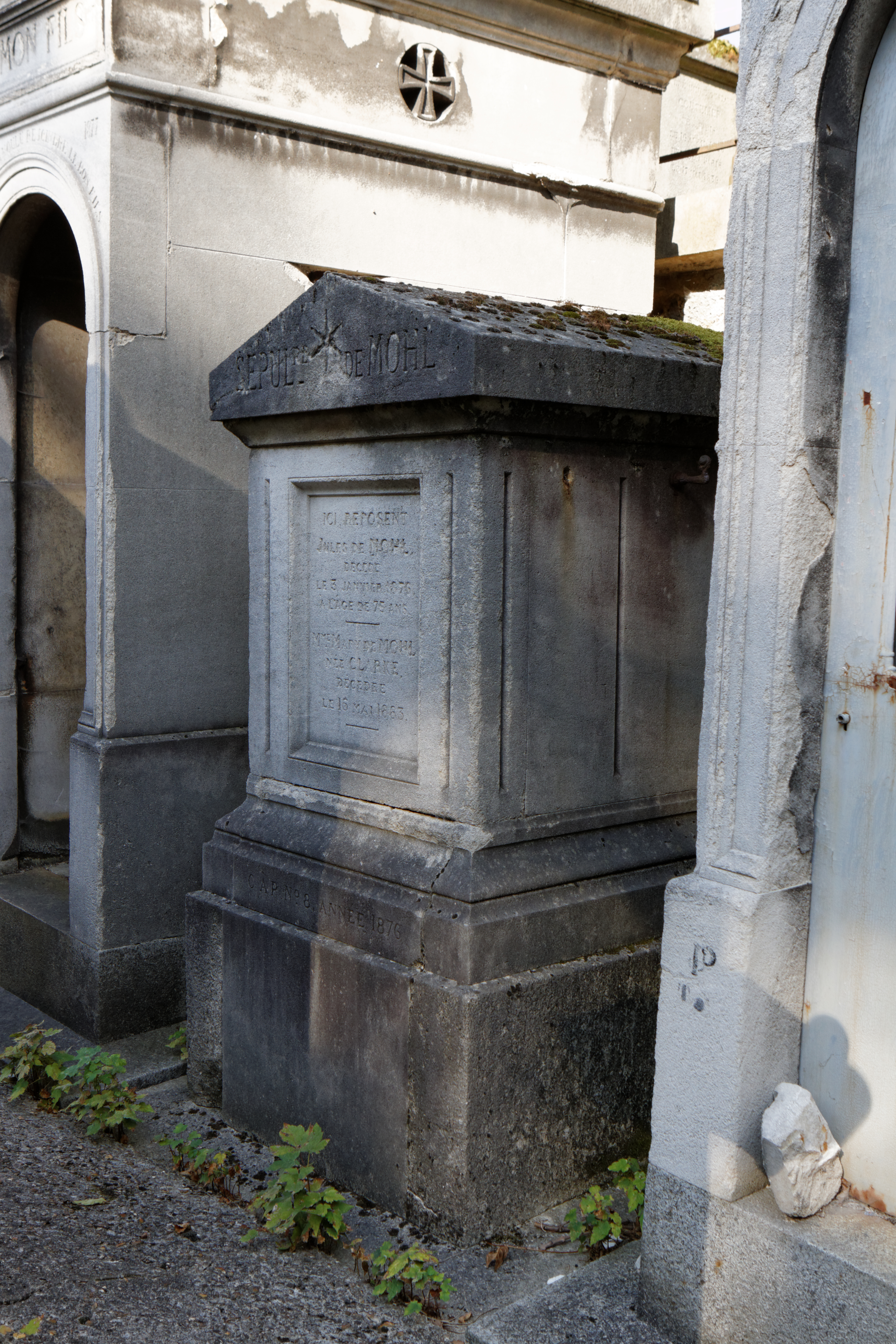
Grave at Père Lachaise Cemetery (56th division)

== Works ==
In 1826 he was charged by the French government with the preparation of an edition of the Shahnameh (Livres des Rois) (Book of Kings by Ferdowsi, the Persian epic poet), the first volume of which appeared in 1838, while the seventh and last was left unfinished at his death, being completed by Barbier de Meynard. His annual reports on Oriental science, presented to the society from 1840 to 1867, and collected after his death under the title Vingt-sept ans d'histoire des études orientales (Paris, 1879), are a history of the progress of Eastern learning during these years. Concerning the discoveries at Nineveh he wrote Lettres de M. Botta sur les découvertes à Khorsabad (1845). He also published anonymously, in conjunction with Justus Olshausen (1800–1882), Fragments relatifs à la religion de Zoroastre (Paris, 1829); Confucii Chi-king sive liber carminum, ex latina P. Lacharmi interpretatione (Stuttgart, 1830); and an edition of Y-King, Antiquissimus Sinarum liber, ex interpretatione P. Regis (Stuttgart, 1834–1839).

== Family ==
His wife Mary (1793–1883), daughter of Charles Clarke, had passed a great part of her early life in Paris, where she was very intimate with Madame Récamier, before their marriage in 1847, and for nearly forty years her house was one of the most popular intellectual centers in Paris. Madame Mohl's friends included a large number of Englishmen and Englishwomen, including Florence Nightingale and her family. She died in Paris on 14 May 1883. Madame Mohl wrote Madame Récamier, with a Sketch of the History of Society in France (London, 1862).

Mohl's elder brother, Robert von Mohl (1799–1875), was a well-known jurist and statesman. Another brother, Moritz von Mohl (1802–1888), entered official life at an early age and was a member of the Frankfort parliament, and later of the parliament of Württemberg and of the imperial Reichstag. He was a voluminous writer on economic and political questions.
