= University of Berlin (disambiguation) =

Berlin University or University of Berlin may refer to:

- Humboldt University of Berlin (HU Berlin), founded in 1809 as University of Berlin; renamed Friedrich Wilhelm University in 1828; renamed Humboldt-Universitat in 1949
- Technische Universität Berlin (TU Berlin), founded 1879
- Free University of Berlin (FU Berlin), founded 1948
- Berlin University of the Arts, known in German as Universität der Künste Berlin (UdK), founded 1696

== See also ==
- List of universities, colleges, and research institutions in Berlin
