= Constantin François Chassebœuf, comte de Volney =

French philosopher and politician

Volney
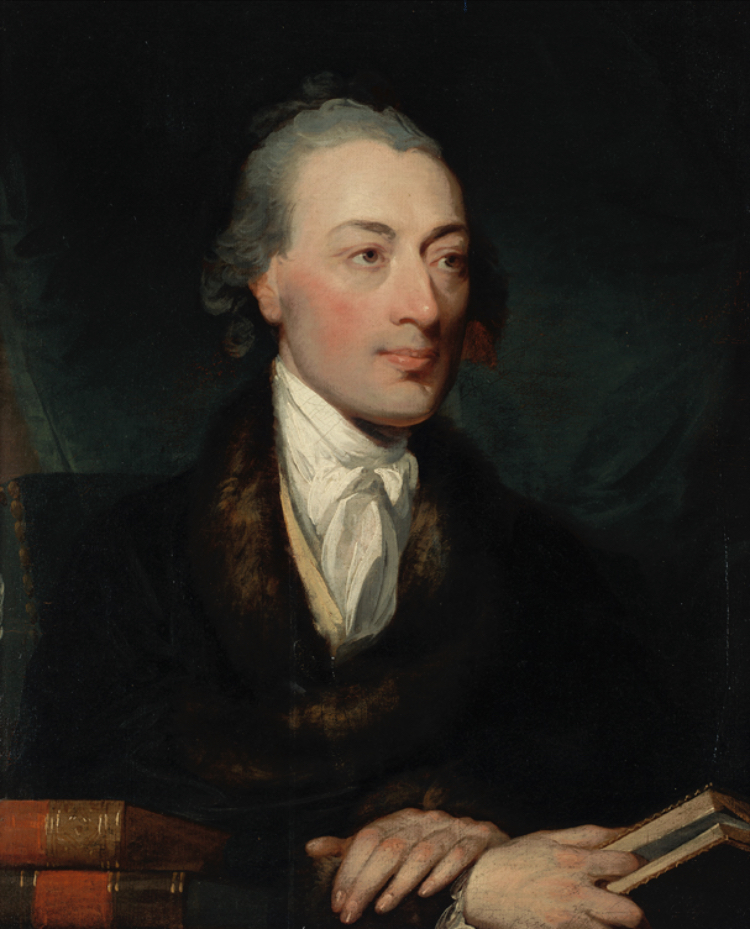
- Portrait of Volney by Gilbert Stuart (Philadelphia, PAFA, 1795)
- Born: 3 February 1757; Craon, Anjou, Kingdom of France
- Died: 25 April 1820 (aged 63); Paris, Kingdom of France

Constantin-François Chassebœuf de La Giraudais [French: [kɔ̃stɑ̃tɛ̃ fʁɑ̃swa ʃasəbœf də la ʒiʁodɛ]] (3 February 1757 – 25 April 1820), known by his pen name Volney, was a French philosopher, historian, orientalist, and politician.

As a young man, he was a regular at the salon of Madame Helvétius in Paris, where he met Benjamin Franklin during the American Revolutionary War. He first came to prominence in 1787 with the publication of an account of his travels through Ottoman Egypt and Syria. During the French Revolution, he represented the Anjou Third Estate at the Estates General of 1789 before serving in the National Constituent Assembly. In 1791, he published The Ruins, a philosophical meditation on the rise and fall of civilizations that envisioned a future "General Assembly of Nations". He was also among the earliest proponents of the Christ myth theory.

Imprisoned during the Reign of Terror, Volney travelled to the United States in 1795. A friend of Thomas Jefferson, he aroused the suspicions of President John Adams, who regarded him as a foreign agent, prompting his departure from the country in 1798. After returning to France, he supported the Coup of 18 Brumaire and was appointed to the Senate. He advised Napoleon during the early years of the Consulate but distanced himself after the Concordat with the Catholic Church. In 1808, Napoleon created him Count of the Empire. Following the Bourbon Restoration, Louis XVIII appointed him to the Chamber of Peers.

A member of the Académie Française, the American Philosophical Society, the Asiatic Society, and the Celtic Academy, Volney published studies on ancient chronology and comparative linguistics, and devised a system of phonetic transcription that he described as a "universal alphabet".

== Early life ==
Constantin-François Chassebœuf (Note: The spelling Chassebœuf, with the ligature œ, gradually superseded the original form Chassebeuf.) de La Giraudais was born on 3 February 1757 in Craon. His father, Jacques-René Chassebœuf (1727–1796), was a lawyer descended from a family of judicial officers. (Note: Originally of peasant stock, the Chassebœuf family gradually rose in wealth and social standing during the seventeenth and eighteenth centuries, eventually becoming one of Craon's notable families. Volney's great-great-grandfather was a royal bailiff, his great-grandfather a notary, and his grandfather a magistrate who served as mayor of the town in 1741.) His mother, Jeanne Gigault (1728–1759), was the daughter of Joseph Gigault (1688–1771), sieur of La Giraudais, an estate near the Candé barony. The Gigault family lived in a manor house and had relations with members of the Parlement of Brittany in Rennes and wealthy merchants in Nantes.

His mother died in the summer of 1759, when he was two years old. Frail from childhood, he was raised by two superstitious governesses, who instilled in him a fear of ghosts. His relationship with his father was cold and distant, and remained so throughout his life. At the age of seven, he was sent to a small religious boarding school in Ancenis. Like many schoolchildren of his time, he was subjected to corporal punishment by his teachers. He grew particularly close to his mother's family, especially his uncle Louis, whose daughter Charlotte (1766–1864) he married half a century later.

At the age of twelve, Constantin-François entered the Oratorian school at Angers, where he received a solid classical education. He also attended the Jesuit college in Rennes. Known as Boisgirais, (Note: The name derived from one of his father's farms.) he developed an early scepticism toward the historical and religious instruction he received. He became interested in the origins of the Bible and resolved to learn Hebrew in order to produce his own translations. His studious and solitary disposition earned him the nickname "the hermit" among his classmates. One of them, François-Yves Besnard, who remained a lifelong friend, later recalled:

Volney was the only one in the household who never took part in our games, although he would willingly remain a silent spectator for hours on end.

Shortly before his eighteenth birthday, he enrolled in the Faculty of Law at Angers and asked for legal independence, which was granted by a family council convened in Craon. Living on the income inherited from his mother, he left his native province for Paris in the summer of 1775.

=== Paris and the Enlightenment ===
Soon after arriving in Paris, his fragile health led him to abandon the study of law in favour of medicine. For the next three years, he pursued practical medical training at the Hôtel-Dieu de Paris, situated beside Notre-Dame, where he became acquainted with Jean-Claude Delamétherie and Joseph Louis Proust.

In 1777, he met Cabanis at the Paris Faculty of Medecine. Introduced by Turgot to the salon of Baron d'Holbach, Cabanis in turn presented the young Boisgirais to its host. At d'Holbach's gatherings, held on the Rue Royale-Saint-Roch, he encountered such leading figures of the French Enlightenment as Denis Diderot, Jean le Rond d'Alembert, and Buffon. D'Holbach's atheism and materialism, as expounded in his book The System of Nature, profoundly influenced Boisgirais. In particular, the idea that morality should rely on reason and social necessity rather than superstition remained central to his later thought.

Beginning in the spring of 1778, during Voltaire's triumphant and final return to Paris, Cabanis and Boisgirais also became regular visitors to the salon of Madame Helvétius at Auteuil, where they were even accommodated for a time. Widowed since 1771, Madame Helvétius had lost her only son, who, like them, had been born in 1757 but died in infancy. Both young men having lost their mothers in childhood, she came to regard them almost as adopted sons.

Among the regular guests at Auteuil were Denis Diderot, Jean le Rond d'Alembert, Antoine Lavoisier, Condorcet, and Malesherbes. Boisgirais also met Benjamin Franklin, a close friend of Madame Helvétius. He may have been initiated into the Les Neuf Sœurs Masonic lodge during this period, although no documentary evidence confirms that he was ever a Freemason. (Note: The Bossu register records him as a visitor to the lodge Saint-Pierre de la Parfaite Union in Saumur in 1787. Later in life, he described Freemasons as "misguided disciples" of Pythagoreanism and denied the continuity of an ancient esoteric tradition. He also expressed distrust of secret societies in general.)

Before completing his medical studies, Boisgirais abandoned medicine to devote himself to Oriental studies. Already proficient in Ancient Greek and Biblical Hebrew, he attended the Arabic course taught at the Collège de France in 1780 by Le Roux Deshauterayes, who introduced him to the works of Thomas Erpenius, Johann Heinrich Michaelis, and Carsten Niebuhr, then the principal authorities in Arabic studies. Convinced that genuine knowledge required direct experience, he resolved to travel to the Near East rather than remain a scholar confined to books.

In the summer of 1782, he withdrew to his uncle's home in Anjou, where he undertook a rigorous programme of physical training to prepare himself for the hardships of travel. It was as he set out on his journey that he adopted the pseudonym Volney, a contraction of Voltaire and Ferney, where the philosopher had spent the last years of his life.

== Journey to Egypt and Syria ==
Volney's journey was motivated by more than scholarly interests or a taste for adventure. According to Jean Gaulmier, he was entrusted with a covert intelligence mission by the services of Comte de Vergennes, (Note: During the early years of the reign of Louis XVI, the gradual weakening of the Ottoman Empire, following the Russo-Turkish War (1768–1774), divided French diplomacy into two opposing camps. One favoured exploiting the Empire's expected disintegration by conquering Egypt, while the other advocated preserving the Ottoman state against Austrian and Russian ambitions, in keeping with the long-standing Franco-Ottoman alliance. The first position was defended by Antoine de Sartine, Minister of the Navy, and Comte de Saint-Priest, French ambassador to Constantinople. In 1777, the Baron de Tott carried out a military reconnaissance mission in Egypt and recommended its conquest. The second policy, maintaining the status quo, was consistently supported by Vergennes, Secretary of State for Foreign Affairs, who preferred to concentrate on the Franco-American alliance. Volney's journey took place within this diplomatic context, and the conclusions of his published account largely coincided with Vergennes's views.) This hypothesis is supported by the importance he attached to political and military observations in the work published after his return. (Note: In the preface, Volney wrote: "Considering the political circumstances in which the Turkish Empire has found itself for the past twenty years, and reflecting on their possible consequences, I thought it a matter of considerable interest to acquire accurate knowledge of its internal administration, in order to assess its strength and resources." From the opening pages, he commented on the weakness of Alexandria's defences, manned by Janissaries who, he wrote, "know only how to smoke their pipes". He nevertheless argued that the city would be of little value to a foreign conqueror because of its lack of access to fresh water. Throughout his journey, he carefully recorded the state of fortifications and garrisons, the competence of commanders, and the quality of military equipment.)

=== Itinerary (1783–1785) ===
Volney sailed from Marseille aboard a corvette in December 1782 and landed at Alexandria early in 1783. He then travelled up the Nile to Cairo. (Note: At the time, Cairo was affected by political unrest and had largely been abandoned by the French community. Volney was nevertheless able to rely on the experienced guidance of Magallon, the French vice-consul.)

After visiting the Giza pyramid complex, where he spent a night sleeping beneath the stars, he travelled to Suez on the shores of the Red Sea in July. On 26 September 1783, he left Cairo and descended the Nile to Damietta, eager to leave Egypt as the country was being ravaged by famine and the plague. (Note: The famine was exacerbated by the climatic effects of the Laki eruption in Iceland.)

Volney initially travelled mainly by sea, which he considered both safer and faster. He called at the ports of Jaffa, Acre, Tyre, Sidon, and Beirut, before stopping at Larnaca on the island of Cyprus in November. He then landed at Alexandretta, and travelled south through the interior. He spent the turn of the year 1784 in Aleppo, before continuing to Tripoli on the Mediterranean coast.

In the spring, he crossed the still snow-covered Mount Lebanon and reached the monastery of Dhour El Choueir, where he was received by the Chouerite Basilian monks. From there, he made several excursions to Beirut, Antoura, Deir el Qamar, Jabal al-Druze, Damascus, and Baalbek.

In October, Volney took leave of his Basilian hosts and travelled south along the Jordan River to Jerusalem. Passing through Bethlehem and Jericho, he continued to the Dead Sea before returning westward to Jaffa and then south to Gaza in January 1785. There, he spent several weeks among the Huwaytat, a palestinian tribe whose customs he described in his published account. Finding the austerity of their pastoral way of life uncongenial, (Note: During one conversation, the tribe's sheikh remarked that he was surprised Volney had chosen to leave his homeland, where water was plentiful.) he eventually parted from them.

In March 1785, Volney embarked at Acre with the painter Louis-François Cassas, who supplied him with drawings of the ruins of Palmyra – the setting of The Ruins, which Volney himself never saw – and presented him with a drawing of the Great Sphinx of Giza and the pyramids. After a brief stop at Alexandria, he landed at Marseille in April 1785, bringing to an end a journey that had lasted twenty-eight months.

=== Return to France ===
Upon his return, Volney went directly to Paris, where he resumed attending the salon of Baron d'Holbach and the Auteuil circle of Madame Helvétius. Preparing to return to America, Benjamin Franklin introduced him to Thomas Jefferson, who was to succeed him as minister of the United States to France.

In June 1785, Volney returned to Craon. The celebrations held in his honour and the curiosity of the local inhabitants, which at first flattered his vanity, soon became tiresome. His affected and disdainful silence offended some of his childhood friends. (Note: Volney later recalled: "When I returned from my journey to the East, the height of my reputation was intoxicating. I was the centre of attention in every gathering; people questioned me, listened to me, and I was carried away by it. In time, however, the questions became tedious, then unbearable, and I eventually withdrew from society.")

He also learned that his young cousin Charlotte Gigault de La Giraudais, with whom he had long been secretly in love, had married a notary from Nantes. Bitterly disappointed, he sold the estates near Candé that he had inherited from his mother and returned in the autumn to the household of Madame Helvétius. It was at Auteuil that he wrote his first major work, drawing on the comments and stylistic advice of his circle of friends.

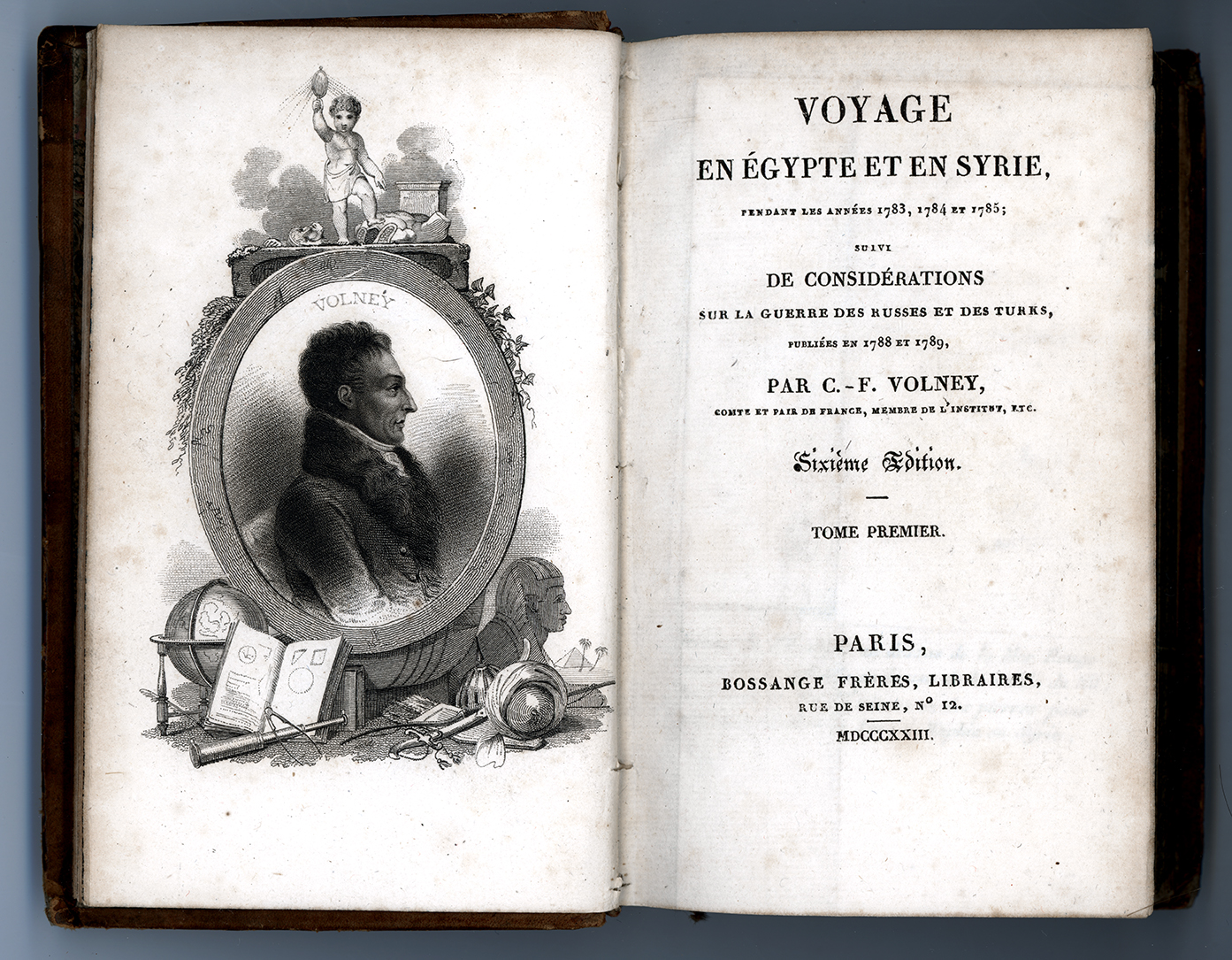
Frontispiece and title page of Travels in Egypt and Syria (1823 edition).

Travels in Egypt and Syria received royal censorship approval on 1 February 1787.

Following the principles of Denis Diderot and Jean le Rond d'Alembert's Encyclopédie – both of whom had died during his absence – Volney adopted a multidisciplinary approach. For each of the two countries he studied, he first presented a description of its "physical state", encompassing geology, hydrology, meteorology, and epidemiology, (Note: One entire chapter is devoted to the diseases prevalent in Egypt. Describing Cairo, Volney wrote: "Walking through the streets of Cairo, I have often encountered, out of a hundred people, twenty blind, ten one-eyed, and twenty others whose eyes were red, suppurating, or clouded. Almost everyone wears bandages, a sign of either incipient or recovering ophthalmia." Although exaggerated, this description reflects the prevalence of eye diseases in Egypt while also serving as a symbolic contrast between the supposed blindness of the East and the ideals of the European Enlightenment.) followed by a description of its "political state", combining ethnography, political science, psychology, economics, and agronomy.

The attention he devoted to quantitative observation and factual detail, (Note: Charles-Augustin Sainte-Beuve ironically described this as "the ideal of statistical writing". He reproached Volney for producing prose that was "dreary, arid, alternately medical and topographical".) together with the precision and restraint of his style, contrasted sharply with what he called the "storytellers of systematic reveries". He criticized the tendency of travel writers to embellish their accounts, (Note: In the preface, Volney observed that travellers often exaggerated in order to satisfy the curiosity of their audiences, creating a reciprocal relationship in which admiration encouraged ever more sensational descriptions.) in particular the idealized depictions of Egypt by Claude-Étienne Savary, to which he opposed an austere realism. (Note: Comparing Savary's idyllic description of Egyptian women bathing in the Nile with his own observations, Volney insisted that the muddy waters of the Nile and the appearance of ordinary Egyptian life bore little resemblance to the poetic visions found in earlier travel literature.)

Volney presented a disillusioned and pessimistic portrait of the Near East as a region afflicted by poverty, violence, and ignorance. Deviating from Montesquieu's climate theory, he instead emphasized what he regarded as the destructive effects of Ottoman despotism. (Note: Volney wrote that "The Turks know how to conquer, but they do not know how to govern." Commenting on the neglected harbour of Alexandria, he added: "In Turkey, things are destroyed but never repaired... The Turkish spirit is to ruin the works of the past and the hopes of the future, because under the barbarism of ignorant despotism there is no tomorrow.")

According to Volney, theocracy and tyranny (Note: His criticism of arbitrary power and religious fanaticism echoed the ideas of Voltaire, Claude Adrien Helvétius, and Paul Henri Thiry d'Holbach.) condemned individuals to political and intellectual lethargy, reducing them to members of a fearful, anxious, and resigned community. (Note: Edward Said later regarded the work as an example of the reification of the Orient and identified Volney as a precursor of nineteenth-century European Orientalism. See Urs App, The Birth of Orientalism, University of Pennsylvania Press, 2010, pp. 440–479.) Beneath its description of the contemporary Near East, the work also contained an implicit critique of the Ancien Régime's absolutism and clericalism.

==== Reflections on ancient Egypt ====
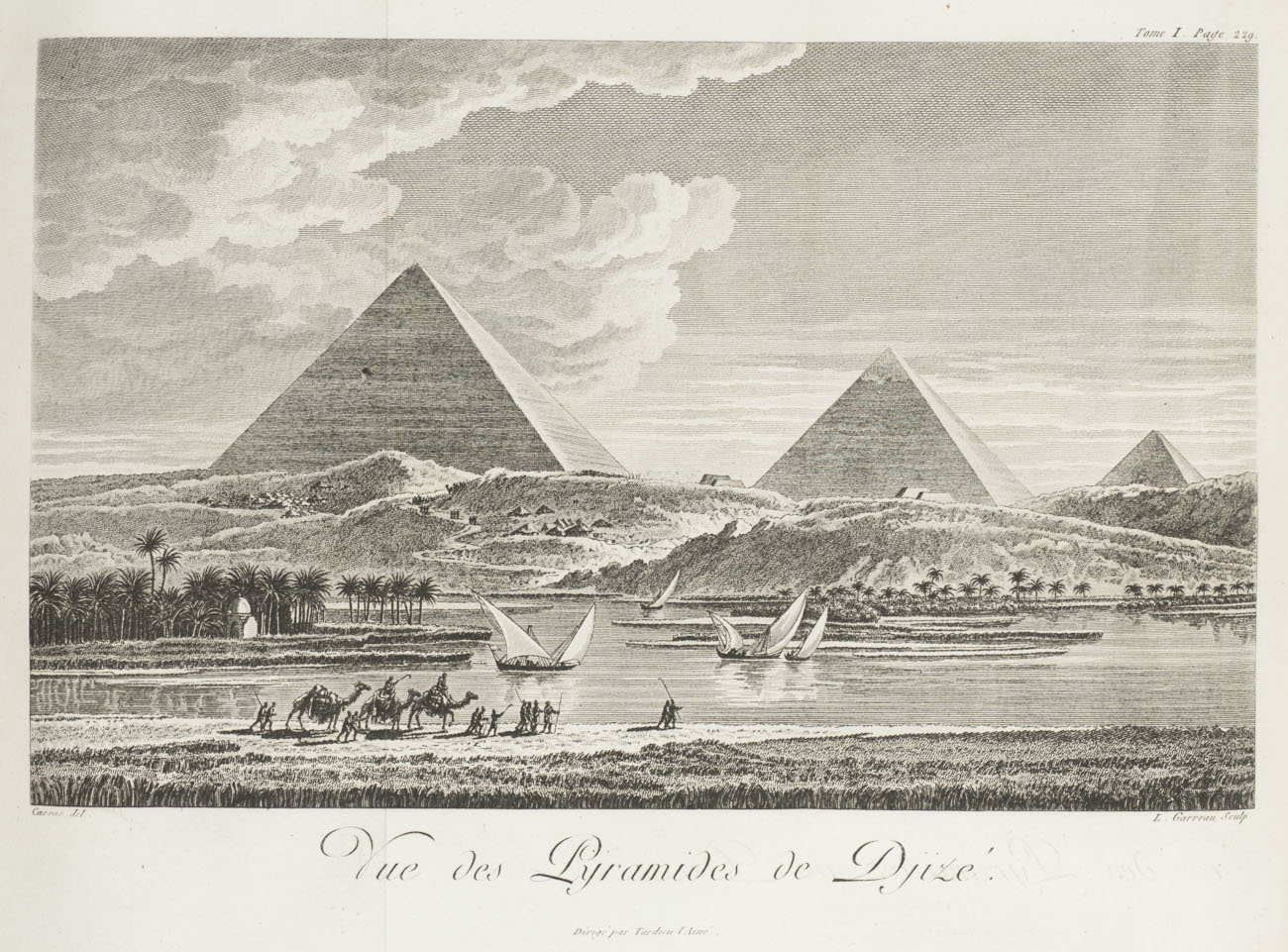
Illustration of the Giza pyramid complex in the 1787 edition of Travels in Egypt and Syria.

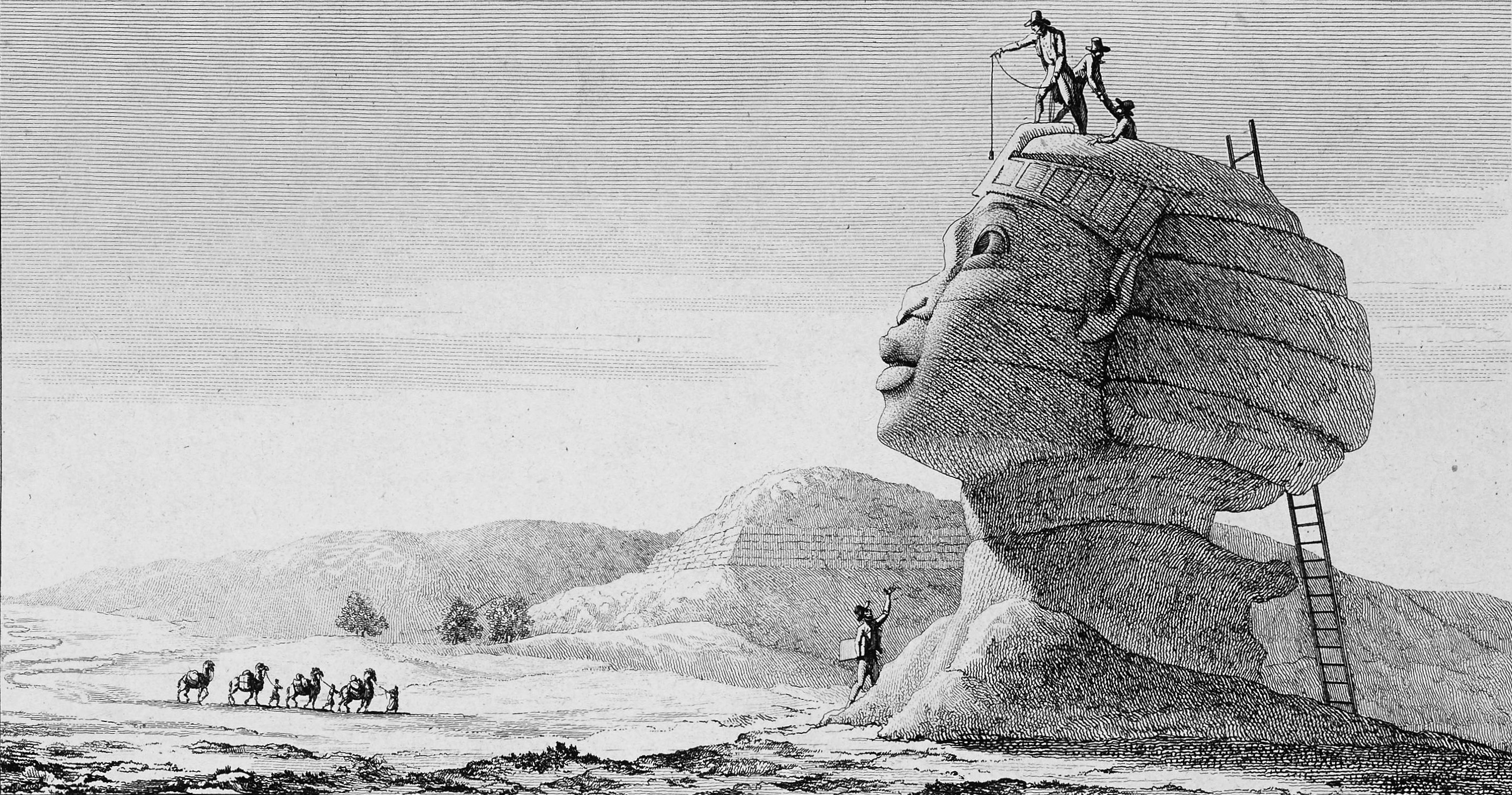
The Great Sphinx of Giza, after a drawing by Dominique Vivant Denon (1798).

Although initially overwhelmed by the Great Pyramid of Giza, (Note: Volney wrote that the monument inspired "astonishment, terror, humiliation, admiration, and reverence all at once.") Volney's fascination soon gave way to disillusionment. He came to regard it as "the pride of useless luxury", the enduring monument of an ancient injustice: "one cannot but grieve to think that, in order to build a vain tomb, an entire nation had to be oppressed for twenty years."

Volney believed that the Great Sphinx of Giza possessed distinctly negro features. He wrote:

What a subject for meditation, to behold the present barbarism and ignorance of the Copts, descended from the union of the profound genius of the ancient Egyptians and the brilliant spirit of the ancient Greeks; to reflect that this race of black men, today our slaves and the object of our contempt, is the very people to whom we owe our arts, our sciences, and even the use of speech. Finally, to imagine that it is among the nations which proclaim themselves the greatest friends of liberty and humanity that the most barbarous slavery has been sanctioned, and that it has even been questioned whether black men possess the same intelligence as white men.

The mummies and engraved heads discovered by the French expedition to Egypt contradicted this idea, and Volney retracted in a late work published in 1814, entitled New researches on ancient History.

The view that the ancient Egyptians were of sub-Saharan African origin is now largely rejected in light of modern genetic research.

==== Reception and legacy of Travels in Egypt and Syria ====
The publication of Volney's Travels in Egypt and Syria was a major literary event. His account was compared to the Histories of Herodotus. An English translation appeared in London as early as 1787, followed by editions in several other European languages. Baron Grimm, whom Volney had met at d'Holbach's salon, presented a copy to Catherine the Great.

Ten years later, members of the French expedition to Egypt unanimously praised the accuracy of Volney's descriptions, maintaining that he was the only traveller who had never misled them. The artist Dominique Vivant Denon wrote:

"Everything is there: form, colour, sensation, all rendered with such truth that, rereading these fine pages a few months later, I believed myself once again returning to Alexandria."

His book established Volney's reputation as a young traveller returning from the East endowed with the secrets of ancient wisdom. His work influenced several Romantic writers, including François-René de Chateaubriand, whose Itinerary from Paris to Jerusalem (1811), Alphonse de Lamartine, whose Voyage en Orient (1835), and Gérard de Nerval, whose Voyage en Orient (1851), all refer to Volney. (Note: The painter Henriette Browne described Volney's work as "so accurate and so well executed that it must be regarded as one of the finest of its kind.")

=== Considerations on the War of the Turks and the Russians ===
The success of Travels in Egypt and Syria brought Volney into diplomatic circles. He established contacts with the secretary of the French embassy in Venice, the representative of the King of Spain, and, above all, the American minister Thomas Jefferson.

On 26 February 1788, he published his second work, Considerations on the War of the Turks and the Russians, written in response to the outbreak of the Seventh Russo-Turkish War the previous summer. In it, Volney examined the likely consequences of the conflict and the policy he believed France should adopt in order to safeguard its interests.

He argued that the Ottoman Empire was in irreversible decline and that its attempts at reform were doomed by the obscurantism of its ruling elites. By contrast, Russia, still dismissed by many Europeans as a nation of "Asian barbarians", had steadily increased in power since the reign of Peter the Great.

Convinced that Russia's victory was inevitable, Volney advocated French neutrality as the only realistic policy. He rejected Baron de Tott's proposal to conquer Egypt, arguing that such an undertaking would require France to wage simultaneous wars against Great Britain, the Ottoman Empire, and the Mamluks, an impossible burden for an already heavily indebted kingdom. France's priority, he maintained, should instead be domestic reform.

In June 1788, Catherine the Great sent Volney a gold medal through the intermediary of Baron Grimm. His Considerations were, however, received rather coolly in French diplomatic circles, where Volney was regarded as an indiscreet outsider who underestimated the dangers posed by a Russian partition of the Ottoman Empire.

== The French Revolution ==
By 1787 and 1788, Volney had become part of several Parisian intellectual circles. He frequented the Hôtel de la Monnaie, where Condorcet and his wife Sophie regularly hosted dinners. (Note: Charles-Augustin Sainte-Beuve, who collected numerous testimonies about Volney, praised his conversational gifts: "He spoke well in a salon; he spoke as he wrote, with the same clarity, and his words flowed naturally. People enjoyed listening to him.") Through Jean-Claude Delamétherie, he was introduced to the Masonic milieu and became acquainted with Lalande, founder of The Nine Sisters, and Charles François Dupuis, whose astronomical interpretation of myth inspired Volney’s Ruins. During this period, he also met Mirabeau, Sieyès, and Guillotin.

He joined the Society of the Friends of the Blacks, shortly after its foundation in February 1788 by Jacques Pierre Brissot and Abbé Grégoire. His abolitionist views, despite his personal fortune being invested in the commercial economy of Nantes, earned him the hostility of a number of leading figures in his native province.

=== La Sentinelle du Peuple ===
On 8 August 1788, Louis XVI summoned the Estates-General to meet the following spring. Volney travelled to Rennes, the parliamentary capital of Brittany, intending to take an active part in the political struggle.

The first issue of La Sentinelle du Peuple ("The Sentinel of the People"), a periodical addressed to all members of the Third Estate of Brittany, appeared in November. Volney urged commoners to resist established authority. He demanded equality before taxation, the abolition of the hereditary transmission of public offices, and voting by head rather than by order, which he regarded as essential if the Third Estate was to prevail at the Estates-General. (Note: Describing the unrest in Brittany, François-René de Chateaubriand later referred to Volney as "a scribbler arrived from Paris" who was "stirring up hatred".) He also openly attacked one of the province's leading noblemen, the Count of Serrant, who had accused him of being a paid agitator. (Note: Volney replied: "If a powerful enemy sought to deprive you of your dignities, your military rank, in a word, your nobility, would you remain silent? Can I then remain silent when you attempt to deprive me of mine? For we commoners have our own nobility: public esteem; and we value it above all because it is obtained neither by favour, nor intrigue, nor faction.")

The exceptionally harsh winter of 1788–1789 intensified both poverty and popular unrest. After the Rennes riot of January 1789, Volney left for Angers, where he stood for election to the Estates-General. The legal proceedings brought against him by the deeply unpopular Parlement of Brittany, which ordered his pamphlets to be publicly burned, contributed to his election on 19 March 1789. (Note: The Count of La Galissonnière, Seneschal of Anjou and representative of the nobility at the Estates-General, wrote to Barentin (Keeper of the Seals of France) on 21 March 1789 that "The faction elected him because of the Parliament's decree itself, as if to mock its authority.") He became one of the nine deputies of the Third Estate representing the Bailiwick of Angers, alongside Louis-Marie de La Révellière-Lépeaux.

=== The Estates General ===
When Volney arrived at Versailles in mid-April 1789, he was among the best-known of the deputies elected by the Third Estate. Owing to his role in the events at Rennes, he was regarded as an ally by the deputies from Britanny led by Jean-Denis Lanjuinais and Isaac Le Chapelier. He took part in the formation of the Club Breton, the precursor of the Jacobins.

The Estates-General opened on 5 May with a speech by Louis XVI. During the following days, disagreement crystallized around the question of voting, the commoners demanding that the Three Estates of the Realm merge into a single assembly. On 17 June, with the deadlock unresolved, the deputies of the Third Estate adopted a motion proposed by Sieyès, declaring that, since they represented the overwhelming majority of the nation, they constituted themselves as the National Assembly. Three days later, during the Tennis Court Oath, they pledged to draft a Constitution. On 27 June, the king ordered the clergy and the nobility to join the Third Estate in a single assembly.

Melancholic and aloof by temperament, Volney quickly grew weary of debates among deputies whom he regarded as vain. (Note: In his diary on 12 May 1789, he wrote: "The tumult of these great assemblies of men, the discord of hearts, the struggle of vanities, have all led me to sad reflections on society itself. I have seen how easy it is to sow discord, arouse passions, rivalries and hatreds, and destroy the public good through the conflict of private interests... This disunion exists above all in assemblies such as ours, composed of men selected because they possess the greatest abilities – and therefore the greatest pretensions. Hence there arises less an emulation for the public good than a jealousy of talents. I observe this irrepressible mania for speaking without listening, so that everyone speaks at once and no one is heard.") He was not a gifted orator, (Note: The British traveller Arthur Young wrote of him: "His voice resembles the sigh of a woman, as though his nerves prevented him from making the effort required to speak loudly enough to be heard; when he utters his ideas, he does so with half-closed eyes, turning his head in a circular motion as if his opinions were to be received as oracles." The weakness of his voice explains his later concern for constructing an assembly chamber with acoustics that would allow everyone to be heard without requiring the "lungs of Stentor".) but he exercised considerable influence behind the scenes. According to Jean Gaulmier, he frequently left it to the tribune Mirabeau to give eloquent expression to ideas that had originated with him.

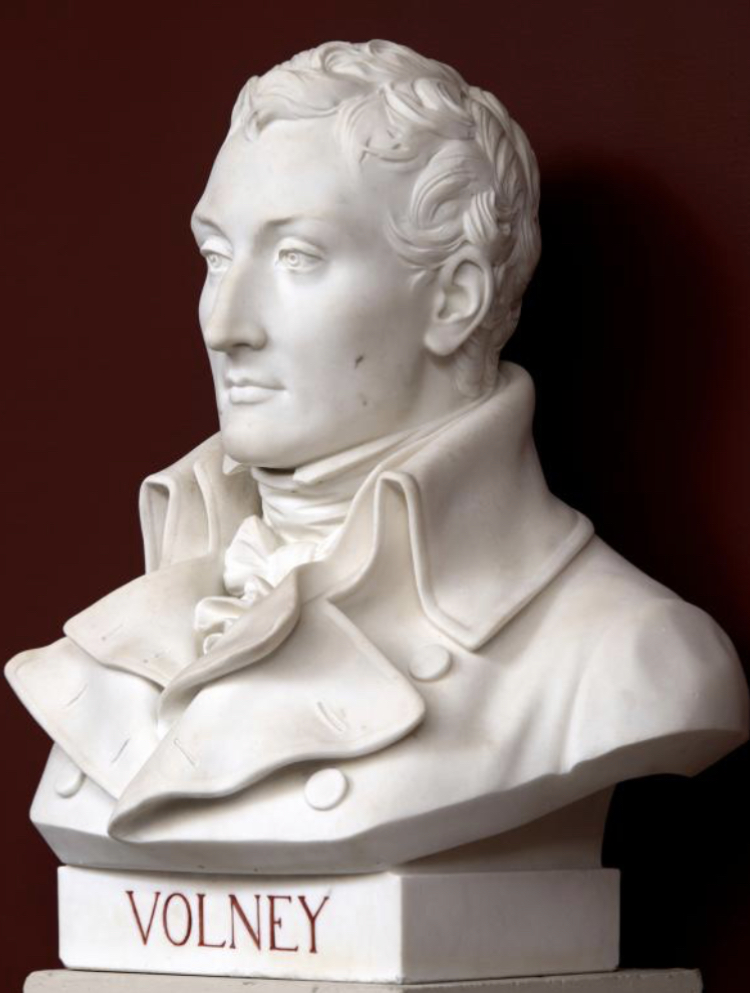
Bust of Volney in the Salle du Jeu de Paume, Versailles, sculpted by Jean-Antoine-Marie Idrac in 1883.

=== National Constituent Assembly ===
Volney was one of the thirty members appointed to the Constitutional Committee, established on 7 July 1789. After the Storming of the Bastille, he regretted the time lost in debates over popular unrest, which he believed distracted the Assembly from organizing France's new institutions. (Note: Volney argued that the Assembly should first organize the parish, municipal and provincial assemblies, thereby ensuring that its decrees would be effectively implemented and calming popular unrest.) His fellow deputies instead devoted themselves to drafting the Declaration of the Rights of Man and of the Citizen. Increasingly frustrated by what he regarded as incoherent methods of deliberation, he also suffered from physical exhaustion. (Note: He complained: "Is it possible that more than two thousand individuals should remain gathered for several hours, even part of the night, in a hall lit by two hundred candles without breathing the most pestilential air?")

During the debates on Jacques Necker's financial plan, Volney strongly advocated the abolition of the gabelle, the salt tax that was particularly unpopular in his native province. (Note: The town of Ingrandes, near Volney's estates at Candé, had been the scene of repeated anti-gabelle disturbances. He argued that the tax was impossible to maintain and yielded little revenue because of widespread smuggling.) Alongside Mirabeau, he also supported the nationalization of Church property, which he deemed to be only solution to the kingdom's enormous budget deficit. Arguing that "the State is all the more powerful when it contains a greater number of proprietors," he favoured the broadest possible subdivision and redistribution of the national property.

In October, the National Constituent Assembly moved from Versailles to Paris, meeting in the Salle du Manège adjoining the Tuileries Palace. Elected one of the Assembly's secretaries on 23 November, Volney resumed his visits to the home of Madame Helvétius. He was a frequent guest of the Duke of Liancourt and regularly met with Talleyrand, Alexandre de Lameth, and Louis Marie de Noailles, aristocratic supporters of the Revolution. He also maintained contacts with the entourage of the Duke of Orléans. During this period, Volney observed that many of his wealthy friends lived in constant fear of riots and peasant.

Volney advised Christophe Saliceti, deputy for the Third Estate of Corsica, and argued before the Assembly in favour of the formal incorporation of Corsica into France, which was approved on 30 November 1789.

In May 1790, during the Constituent Assembly's "Declaration of Peace to the World", Volney advocated the abolition of secret diplomacy so that foreign policy would be determined by the representatives of the nation. He further proposed that France should renounce any war "aimed at enlarging its existing territory." Mirabeau's conduct during the debates surprised him. Suspecting that his friend had entered into secret dealings with the king, he warned him: "Take care, Mirabeau! Yesterday the Capitoline Hill, today the Tarpeian Rock!"

Thereafter, Volney attended the Assembly less regularly, devoting himself instead to writing The Ruins. Increasingly disillusioned with the course of the French Revolution, he regarded the civic cult of the fatherland promoted during the Fête de la Fédération as the prelude to a new form of oppression. Following the death of Mirabeau, he appeared in the Assembly only as a silent observer.

=== Dispute with Baron Grimm ===
On 5 December 1791, Le Moniteur universel published a short letter from Volney addressed to "Baron Grimm, Chargé d'Affaires to Her Majesty the Empress of Russia." Regretting Catherine the Great's support for the émigré princes gathering their forces at Koblenz, Volney requested that Grimm return to the Empress the gold medal she had awarded him in 1788 for his Considerations on the War of the Turks and the Russians. He declared that he could not believe the Empress, so greatly admired by the French philosophers, would knowingly "embrace the cause of the unjust and absurd champions of the superstitious and tyrannical barbarism of past centuries."

On 1 January 1792, a vehement reply to Volney's letter was published at Koblenz under Grimm's name. (Note: Charles-Augustin Sainte-Beuve attributed the pamphlet, without evidence, to Antoine de Rivarol. Another satirical response also appeared under the pseudonym "Petroskoi". In the preface to an 1823 reprint of Grimm's reply, Antoine-Alexandre Barbier wrote: "It offended my sense of propriety to distress so estimable a scholar as M. de Volney. Now that he is no more, I believe I may complete Grimm's minor works. M. de Volney leaves behind him sufficient claims upon public esteem to avenge him from the sarcasms of a former friend whom the most extraordinary circumstances transformed into an implacable enemy.") Mocking Volney's vanity and claiming that he had obtained his "little medal" only after repeated solicitations, the pamphleteer defended the émigrés and accused Volney of venality, repeatedly referring to his alleged annual pension of six thousand livres drawn from the royal treasury.

The satire also targeted Pierre Jean Georges Cabanis, accusing him of having caused the death of Mirabeau, and ridiculed the entire Auteuil circle, dismissing it as "the lodge of the most ridiculous fools on earth." Volney himself was even blamed for "several fires in Anjou" and "several dozen murders."

The pamphlet attracted relatively little attention, whereas Volney's letter – by publicly distancing himself from one of the Revolution's declared enemies – strengthened his reputation as a patriot.

=== Misadventure in Corsica ===
In February 1792, Volney landed at Bastia with Christophe Saliceti in order to conduct agricultural experiments in Corsica. At Corte, he met Lieutenant Napoleon Bonaparte, who accompanied him to Ajaccio, where he introduced Volney to his mother, Letizia Bonaparte.

On 1 May, Volney purchased La Confina, a 550-hectare estate outside Ajaccio, making him the largest landowner in the surrounding area. The property, nicknamed the "Little Indies", cost him 100,000 livres, payable in twelve annual instalments.

Deeply influenced by physiocracy and opposed to overseas colonial expansion, (Note: The decline of the linen industry around Craon, brought about by colonial wars and the loss of overseas markets, contributed to Volney's distrust of colonial ventures. He also anticipated the consequences of a possible abolition of slavery.) Volney hoped to demonstrate that tropical crops – including oranges, date palms, sugarcane, coffee, cotton, and indigo – could be successfully cultivated in the Mediterranean climate.

His stay in Corsica was also motivated by political ambitions. Soon after his arrival, he concluded that political life on the island was characterized by electoral violence, patronage, family alliances, and corruption. He sought election to the departmental executive, hoping subsequently to enter the National Convention alongside Christophe Saliceti, supported by a newspaper modelled on La Sentinelle du Peuple.

Volney expected the support of Pasquale Paoli, whose cause he had defended before the National Constituent Assembly, but the elderly Corsican leader disapproved of the events of August 1792 and distanced himself from the new French Republic. According to Volney, Paoli intended "to drive out the French with the help of the English, then drive out the English with the Corsicans, and finally subdue the Corsicans through his own party and family."

Paoli worked to discredit Volney by portraying him as both a spy and a heretic. These accusations endangered his personal safety and the future of his estate. (Note: Volney later wrote that he had been denounced as "a heretic because of The Ruins, and a dangerous observer because he was French." Shepherds deliberately drove their goat herds through his nurseries, while François-Yves Besnard recalled that Volney ultimately escaped "only with difficulty, thereby avoiding the daggers of assassins.") Fearing for his life, he fled Corsica in February 1793. (Note: A few months later, in June 1793, the Bonaparte family was likewise forced to flee the island.) Paoli subsequently ordered the "Little Indies" estate to be sold at public auction.

=== The Reign of Terror ===
When Volney returned to Paris, one month after the execution of Louis XVI, he found the atmosphere profoundly transformed. France was at war with the First Coalition, while the National Convention was increasingly divided between the Montagnards and the Girondins.

Having incurred substantial debts to finance his Corsican estate, he was unable to pay the first instalment due on the property. Through the intervention of his friend Dominique Joseph Garat, then Minister of the Interior, he obtained a six-month extension on 21 April.

The defection of General Charles François Dumouriez to the Austrian side cast suspicion upon all those associated with the Duke of Orléans. Volney's name was drawn into the affair. In order to protect him, Garat entrusted him with an official observation mission in western France. (Note: Created by decree of the Committee of Public Safety on 15 April 1793, the observer-commissioners were instructed to complete a detailed questionnaire – prepared with Volney's assistance – covering commerce, agriculture, education, public opinion, and religion. Volney's district included the departments of Manche, Ille-et-Vilaine, Loire-Inférieure, Maine-et-Loire, and Mayenne. He was also instructed to study the possibility of making the Oudon navigable as far as Segré.) He was in Nantes in May and Rennes in June, and was therefore absent from Paris during the Insurrection of 31 May – 2 June 1793, which led to the arrest of the Girondin deputies.

=== The Natural Law, or Catechism of the French Citizen ===
At the beginning of September 1793, while in Brittany, Volney published a short work entitled La Loi naturelle, ou Catéchisme du citoyen français (The Natural Law, or Catechism of the French Citizen), intended to summarize and popularize the ideas developed in The Ruins. He sought to establish a universal system of morality, governed by principles as rigorous and demonstrable as those of physics and geometry. (Note: Volney's ethics may be described as broadly utilitarian. Through its rejection of metaphysics, it also foreshadowed aspects of the positivism later developed by Auguste Comte.) (Note: According to Jean Gaulmier, the Catechism reveals "Volney at the age of thirty-five, firmly convinced that he possesses the truth, expressing this certainty through categorical assertions that he regards as self-evident. [...] He distrusts his fellow men too much not to calculate his generosity according to the benefits he himself expects to receive. He approaches life with gravity and condemns frivolity. He detests fashionable society, idle aristocrats, and wasteful luxury. [...] Readily egalitarian when confronted with fortunes larger than his own, he nevertheless maintains that 'poverty is not a virtue', often attributing it to idleness or misconduct. [...] Somewhat vain of his reputation as an enlightened thinker, he displays a distinctly undemocratic contempt for 'the infinite multitude' of fools and the ignorant. [...] Devoid of enthusiasm except for Reason itself, as cautious in protecting his material interests as he was bold in speculation, Volney embodied many of the characteristic traits of the provincial bourgeoisie, still imbued with the solid but unappealing virtues of the peasantry, whose rise would characterize nineteenth-century France.")

This deist (Note: The review published in Le Moniteur universel on 6 September 1793 interpreted Volney's explicit deism as a response to the accusations of atheism levelled against him by his Corsican opponents. It is also possible that he sought to accommodate the political ascendancy of Robespierre, who maintained that "atheism is aristocratic".) and rationalist profession of faith opened with the following definition:

What is the natural law? It is the eternal, immutable, and necessary law by which God governs the universe, and which He himself presents to the senses and the reason of mankind as a common and equal rule, guiding all people, without distinction of nation or sect, toward perfection and happiness.

=== Imprisonment ===
Returning to Paris after the enactment of the Law of Suspects, Volney saw arrests multiplying around him and attempted to secure his own safety. On 18 October, the Executive Council proposed that he undertake a study mission to the United States, where his friendship with Thomas Jefferson was expected to be of service to the French Republic.

While preparing for his departure, Volney was arrested on 16 November 1793 by order of the Committee of General Security. The official reason for his imprisonment was his failure to repay the debts he had incurred in Corsica. The extension he had obtained in the spring for the first instalment on his estate had expired, and Garat – dismissed from office and under attack from the Montagnards – was no longer in a position to protect him.

Initially confined in La Force Prison, Volney was transferred on 24 January 1794 to the Belhomme Prison on medical grounds. On 21 February, shortly after his thirty-seventh birthday, he was moved by order of citizen Froidure to the Coignard Prison, a transfer that probably saved him from the guillotine. (Note: François-Yves Besnard later recalled that Volney told him he owed his life to Froidure, whose decision to transfer him meant that, when officials repeatedly came to fetch prisoners for the Revolutionary Tribunal, another detainee was taken in his place so that the day's quota of executions remained unchanged. Froidure himself was arrested on 29 March and guillotined on 17 June 1794.) He was released on 16 September 1794, several weeks after the fall of Robespierre.

=== The École normale ===
In October 1794, Volney travelled to the Alpes-Maritimes in order to recover his health, which had been seriously weakened by his imprisonment in Paris. At Nice, he met once again Napoleon Bonaparte, who had recently been promoted to the rank of brigadier general. During a dinner conversation, Bonaparte outlined his plan for the conquest of Italy, more than a year before the beginning of his victorious campaign. (Note: The anecdote was related by Jean-Antoine Chaptal. When news of Bonaparte's victories reached him in the United States, Volney wrote that he had already known the general's strategic plan in December 1794, having read it at Nice. He also reportedly remarked before several French émigrés in America: "Given favourable circumstances, he will possess the head of Julius Caesar upon the shoulders of Alexander the Great.")

The government soon recalled him to Paris. Ten writers were commissioned by the Committee of Public Instruction to prepare textbooks for use in the new primary schools. Volney was assigned the task of writing a manual explaining the Declaration of the Rights of Man and of the Citizen and the Constitution of 1793, although the work was never completed. (Note: Other assignments included a republican treatise on morality by Jacques-Henri Bernardin de Saint-Pierre, arithmetic and geometry by Joseph-Louis Lagrange, history by Garat, geography by Edme Mentelle, natural history by Louis-Jean-Marie Daubenton, reading and writing by Roch-Ambroise Cucurron Sicard, industrial technology by Gaspard Monge, and natural phenomena by René Just Haüy. Of these projected textbooks, only Sicard's was eventually published.)

Volney was also consulted by André-François Miot de Mélito, Commissioner for External Relations, in his capacity as a specialist on the Ottoman Empire. He published two short works intended for the use of French diplomacy: a Simplification des langues orientales, presenting a method for learning Arabic, Persian, and Ottoman Turkish through the Latin alphabet, (Note: Volney's treatment of Arabic grammar was elementary but it possessed the advantage of simplicity. It was intended not for specialists but for "travellers and merchants".) and Questions de statistique à l'usage des voyageurs, a questionnaire intended to guide a worldwide programme of empirical observation.

When the École normale was established to train teachers who would then be dispersed throughout France, Volney was appointed professor of history. On 20 January 1795, the day the school opened at the Muséum national d'histoire naturelle in the Jardin des Plantes, he delivered his inaugural lecture.

He began by defining the distinctive nature of history in comparison with the natural sciences. (Note: "History, if it is to be regarded as a science, differs fundamentally from the physical and mathematical sciences. In the physical sciences the facts still exist: they are alive, and may be presented directly to observer and witness. In history the facts no longer exist; they are dead, and cannot be revived before the spectator or confronted with witnesses. The physical sciences appeal directly to the senses; history appeals only to the imagination. [...] Physical facts carry within themselves evidence and certainty. Historical facts, by contrast, appearing only as phantoms reflected in the irregular mirror of the human understanding, can attain no more than probability.") He then considered its moral purpose, its usefulness for the progress of humanity, and the dangers it might also present. (Note: Volney argued that history illuminates its subject by comparing methods adopted by different peoples and periods, by revealing past errors, and by tracing the development of the human mind. Yet he also questioned whether history had done more harm than good by perpetuating false ideas and prejudices. In primary education, he warned, children compelled to accept historical narratives on authority alone might acquire errors lasting throughout their lives, insisting that "half-knowledge is false knowledge, a hundred times worse than ignorance." He criticized the tendency of history to inspire dreams of military glory and rejected the contemporary idealization of Greece and Rome, declaring: "Our ancestors swore by Jerusalem and the Bible; a new sect swears by Sparta, Athens, and Livy." He considered it absurd to celebrate slaveholding and warlike societies as models of liberty and equality.)

His six lectures outlined a method for reconstructing the past rationally, in the manner of an investigator. He gave priority to immutable written sources over oral traditions, in which "all the whims and voluntary or involuntary aberrations of the understanding unfold." He advocated an interdisciplinary approach, maintaining that geography, economics, linguistics, and the study of religion should all contribute to historical knowledge, while emphasizing the importance of apparently minor details, which often revealed more than the great political events themselves.

These lectures reveal that Volney had abandoned the hope, expressed in The Ruins, that humanity might one day escape the recurring cycle of "calamities and errors" in which civilizations were trapped. The destiny of the human species now appeared to him devoid of any intrinsic meaning.

The École normale closed in May 1795 after only five months of operation. Volney then resumed preparations for his journey to the United States, which had been interrupted by his arrest in 1793. During the weeks preceding his departure, he received a visit from Napoleon Bonaparte. Uncertain about his own future, Bonaparte sought Volney's advice regarding the Ottoman Empire, where he was considering offering his services. Volney discouraged the plan, telling him that France offered the best opportunity for his talents to be recognized. (Note: In his Memoirs from Beyond the Grave, François-René de Chateaubriand wrote: "Embittered by persecution, Napoleon contemplated emigration. Volney prevented him.")

== Journey to America ==
Franco-American relations deteriorated in 1795 following the Jay Treaty, which marked a rapprochement between the United States and Great Britain. Volney hoped that his stay in the United States would secure him an appointment as Consul General, or even as French ambassador.

Deeply marked by his imprisonment during the Reign of Terror, he contemplated settling permanently in the New World and acquiring land there. (Note: As early as 1792, Volney's name appeared among the French financiers and bourgeois – including Jacques-Donatien Le Ray de Chaumont – interested in purchasing land in Castorland, New York. Like many of his contemporaries, he was also attracted by the ill-fated Scioto Company scheme. His financial situation had deteriorated further since his imprisonment: the Corsican venture remained unresolved, while the income from his estates in western France had been reduced by the Chouannerie.) As he later wrote:

"Saddened by the past and anxious for the future, I went with misgivings to a free people, to see whether a sincere friend of that liberty now profaned might find, in old age, a peaceful refuge that Europe no longer offered."

He asked James Monroe, then the American minister in Paris, to provide him with letters of introduction to trusted acquaintances in Philadelphia. Throughout his stay he maintained a correspondence with Abbé Grégoire and La Révellière-Lépeaux, who had recently been appointed a Director.

Volney left Le Havre on 13 July 1795. The Atlantic crossing lasted nearly three months. His ship passed through the Bermuda, entered Delaware Bay, and sailed up the river to Philadelphia. There he found a large French expatriate community, (Note: Philadelphia was home to former officers of Rochambeau's army as well as refugees from Saint-Domingue who had fled the Haitian Revolution.) including several former colleagues from the National Constituent Assembly, who gathered at the home of Theophilus Cazenove: Talleyrand, the Duke of Liancourt, Moreau de Saint-Méry, and Louis Marie de Noailles (brother-in-law of Lafayette), who introduced Volney to the influential senator William Bingham and to the three exiled sons of the Duke of Orléans – the Duke of Chartres (later King Louis-Philippe I), the Duke of Montpensier, and the Count of Beaujolais.

He spent the winter learning English and became a regular participant in the American Philosophical Society, founded by Benjamin Franklin. (Note: Pierre Jean Georges Cabanis had been elected a foreign member of the American Philosophical Society as early as 1786, on Franklin's initiative.) During this period he learned that he had been elected in October 1795 to the Council of Five Hundred by the voters of Mayenne, although he never took his seat because of his absence. He was also informed of his election to the National Institute of Sciences and Arts.

In his letters to Director La Révellière, Volney criticized the French ambassador Pierre Adet, arguing that Americans deeply resented what they perceived as French condescension:

"Speak no more of 'benefaction' or 'gratitude': your agents have wounded hearts with such reproaches. Let us consider ourselves quits; let us speak of interests instead, for that is the compass of this country."

He also emphasized the importance of what would now be called soft power :

"Send artists here, distinguished men of letters, a French newspaper, a French college, a library. Support a theatre, a good concert, and let the embassy become a meeting place for cultivated society. Millions are spent killing people in order to conquer them. Yet a hundredth part of that sum, spent on entertaining them, would achieve far surer conquests."

=== Expedition into the country ===
In the spring of 1796, Volney travelled to Georgetown, where the architect William Thornton showed him the construction site of the United States Capitol. He remarked: "The cities of Asia resemble this one somewhat, but they are skeletons; this is an embryo."

He then followed the Potomac to Fredericksburg, before turning southwest and arriving at Monticello on 8 June. He spent three weeks at Thomas Jefferson's estate, where approximately 150 enslaved people were living.

After the harvest, Volney set out westward. During the summer he passed through Gallipolis, where he witnessed the failure of the French settlement, descended the Ohio River to Louisville, making a detour to Fort Vincennes, and went on to visit Frankfort and Cincinnati. In September he travelled to Detroit with a military convoy bound for General Anthony Wayne. He crossed Lake Erie to Niagara Falls, then followed the Hudson River to New York City and returned to Philadelphia in December.

=== Conflict with John Adams ===
The French Revolutionary Wars disrupted American commerce, and relations with France deteriorated after the election of John Adams as president of the United States. Adams distrusted the French Revolutionaries and resented Volney's criticism of his work A Defence of the Constitutions of Government of the United States of America, in which the philosopher detected an attempt to seduce American public opinion through patriotic flattery.

Despite growing hostility toward France, Volney was elected to the American Philosophical Society on 20 January 1797. His election provoked the anger of the English chemist Joseph Priestley, then living in the United States, who circulated a pamphlet accusing him of atheism, thereby damaging his reputation within Philadelphia's Puritan society.

Another English immigrant in America, William Cobbett, launched an even more virulent attack, appealing to xenophobic sentiment by portraying the French as "infidels and cannibals" who had "done more to destroy Europe by preaching their odious doctrine of infidelity than by the combined force of their armies."

In the summer of 1797, Volney travelled once more to Georgetown. William Thornton introduced him to George Washington, who received him for two days at Mount Vernon and publicly expressed his esteem for him. Thomas Jefferson then invited him for a second stay at Monticello. Volney spent the winter in Philadelphia, where he studied the language of the Miami people at the American Philosophical Society.

In April 1798, the XYZ Affair triggered the Quasi-War between France and the United States. The administration of John Adams secured the passage of the Alien and Sedition Acts, which authorized the imprisonment or expulsion of foreigners deemed dangerous. Volney was accused of plotting to deliver Louisiana to the French Directory. He was forced to leave the United States hastily in June 1798.

Thomas Jefferson later wrote to him:

"You left this country in a state of high delirium."

=== View of the Climate and Soil of the United States ===
Following in the footsteps of Crèvecœur, Brissot, Talleyrand, and the Duke of Liancourt, Volney sought to share his American experience with French readers. In 1803, he published a geographical treatise entitled Tableau du climat et du sol des États-Unis (View of the Climate and Soil of the United States).

The work began with a general description of the country's physical geography, including the Atlantic Seaboard, the Appalachian Mountains, and the Mississippi River Basin, before turning to chapters on geology, (Note: Volney appears to have been familiar with the latest theoretical developments in geology, notably the debate between uniformitarianism and catastrophism, and appreciated the importance of geological science for industrial development.) lakes, waterfalls, earthquakes, the climate, and atmospheric circulation. It also included a survey of the principal diseases affecting the population. Volney recommended that the United States government establish learned societies to measure natural phenomena systematically and, where possible, to bring them under human control.

He emphasized the empirical character of his investigation. Whenever he had not personally observed a phenomenon, he identified reliable witnesses – magistrates, military officers, clergymen, or physicians – who had almost always been recommended to him by Thomas Jefferson and William Thornton. Upon his return to France, he entrusted the study of the mineral specimens he had collected to Jean-Claude Delamétherie, and that of his fossils to Jean-Baptiste Lamarck.

In the preface, Volney referred to his disputes with John Adams and paid tribute to Thomas Jefferson, elected president in 1800. He praised the freedom of the press in America, as Napoleon Bonaparte was tightening control over the French press. (Note: "Since Mr. Jefferson's accession to the presidency, the Federalists have never ceased attacking him in the newspapers, yet such is the solidity of the principles upon which he governs that he has allowed everything to be said without his reputation suffering in public opinion." Bonaparte reportedly took exception to these remarks, and Pierre-Louis Roederer replied in the Journal de Paris: "We hope that the Head of Government will not believe it necessary to strengthen his authority by authorizing or encouraging four years of insults against himself, following the example from which Mr. Jefferson has supposedly benefited so well.")

Volney had originally intended to structure the work on the model of Travels in Egypt and Syria, with a second part devoted to a "political survey", but only the geographical volume was ever published. Believing himself to be dying, he left his reflections on American society unfinished. (Note: In a letter to Jefferson dated 10 May 1803, Volney explained that he would not discuss the political situation because "it would require saying either too much or too little." Seriously ill, he drew up his will in October 1803.) Nevertheless, his View, together with his correspondence and unpublished manuscripts, provides a substantial account of American society written some thirty years before Alexis de Tocqueville's Democracy in America.

=== Observations on the Americans ===
Volney intended his observations to be as free from illusion as those he had recorded during his travels in the Near East. The result was a rather pessimistic assessment, running counter to the enthusiasm for the New World shared by many of his contemporaries. He criticized the national vanity of Americans, who imagined themselves to constitute a "new and virgin people", whereas they were in reality nothing more than "an assemblage of inhabitants from old Europe".

In his correspondence, he complained about the filth of American towns, (Note: "Americans boast of their cleanliness, yet I can attest that the docks of New York and Philadelphia, together with certain suburban districts, surpass in public and private filth anything I saw in Turkey. [...] Philadelphia has four enormous cemeteries in its finest neighbourhoods, whose smell I experienced very distinctly during the summer.") the indigestible nature of the local diet, (Note: He found the coffee too weak, the tea too strong, and considered the consumption of pork and butter at breakfast excessive.) and the prevalence of drunkenness throughout the country. He mocked what he saw as the Americans' mercantile spirit, reducing "everything to calculation", and the prominence of lawyers, whom he described as "the priests of the country". He also compared the proud caste of large landowners to the nobility of the French Ancien Régime.

As a disciple of the physiocrats, convinced that wealth ultimately derived from the land, Volney greatly admired the pioneers of American agriculture. In his view, the prosperity of the United States owed far less to the wisdom of its legislators than to the natural resources of its vast territory.

He also discerned the beginnings of the country's isolationist aspirations and pan-American ambitions, made possible by its favourable geopolitical position, removed from the theatres of European warfare. Despite the American Revolutionary War, Britain and the United States had retained especially close ties. During his travels, Volney also noted the persistence of anti-French sentiment. (Note: "I say this with regret: my investigations have not led me to find among the Anglo-Americans the fraternal and benevolent dispositions with which certain writers have flattered us." Having moved in diplomatic circles after his return from Egypt, Volney was well aware of the disappointments experienced by Vergennes.)

He likewise observed the growing contrast between the Northern states, where industrialization was beginning to develop, and the Southern states, whose agricultural economy depended entirely upon slavery.

=== Enslavement of African Americans ===
Volney's unpublished manuscript devoted passages to slavery in the United States, condemning it both for its inhumanity and for its harmful economic consequences. (Note: At Georgetown, he observed that slavery encouraged idleness among whites, while enslaved labourers themselves were insufficiently productive to constitute profitable investments. He wrote: "They are no longer wanted as slaves because they are too costly; hired white labour is preferred. They are not wanted as tenants because they would become proprietors. People cannot bear the idea of treating them as equals or of mixing races with them; yet they grow restless and weary of their condition. The Quakers encourage them; they become insubordinate and rebellious, and unless care is taken they will commit some serious act.")

At Monticello, Volney closely observed Jefferson's enslaved workers: "Those haggard faces, that anxious, furtive expression, those fearful and hostile glances – taken together they filled me with sadness and terror." He described an episode in which Jefferson seized a whip to frighten his workers:

"It became almost comic. Standing in the middle of the group, he bustled about, scolding, threatening, and turning in every direction. As he turned, the Blacks changed their behaviour: those directly under his gaze worked harder; those only half observed worked less; those whom he could not see stopped working altogether."

Conversations among Thomas Jefferson's guests often turned to what they called "the Nigger problem", for which several solutions were proposed:

"Some wish to send all the Blacks back to Africa; others propose establishing a republic for them in a western district beyond the Mississippi. Others again believe it would be preferable to educate them and make them capable of using wisely the liberty that would become the certain reward of their good conduct."

When confronted with the racist assertions of a planter from South Carolina, Volney replied that in Brittany the sons of boorish peasants had become "notaries, lawyers, and clergymen of distinguished ability." He concluded: "Educate your Blacks, set them free, and the same will happen to them."

He believed that interracial marriage would eventually produce a society without distinctions of colour, despite observing that the mixed-race children born on plantations remained enslaved.

=== The "Savages" ===
Volney concluded his work with a chapter entitled "Clarifications on the Savages." He took a keen interest in the Indigenous peoples of North America, fearing that "within a hundred years" they would have disappeared, taking with them both their history (Note: In Volney's view, because they possessed no written records, Indigenous peoples preserved "no exact tradition of any event more than a hundred years old.") and their culture.

His original intention had been to live for a time among one of their communities, as he had done with a tribe near Gaza, but settlers strongly discouraged the idea, assuring him that no tradition of hospitality existed among the "savages" and that their "social condition was one of anarchy and savage brutality." His visit to Fort Vincennes reinforced this opinion. There he observed the Piankeshaw, who appeared to him "dirty, drunken, lazy, thievish, excessively proud, easily wounded in their vanity, and then cruel, bloodthirsty, implacable in hatred, and atrocious in revenge." (Note: Volney attributed these characteristics not to innate degeneration—rejecting the theories of Cornelius de Pauw—but to the harsh conditions of life endured by nomadic hunting societies. He repeatedly compared Indigenous peoples to the Greeks of the Heroic Age, citing Thucydides to illustrate the similarities. In his view, contact with Europeans had transmitted chiefly the most degrading vices, particularly alcoholism.)

Early in 1798, while in Philadelphia, Volney held several conversations with Little Turtle, the famous chief of the Miami people. Volney described him as a wise man. Little Turtle understood that the principal source of European power lay in their mastery of agriculture, which enabled them to sustain large populations on relatively limited territories. Lamenting the relentless expansion of the settlers, he declared:

"We melt away like snow beneath the spring sun. Unless we change our course, it is impossible for the race of red men to survive."

The question of land ownership lay at the centre of Volney's reflections on Indigenous societies. Like many French deputies of 1789, he regarded private property as essential to the sense of belonging within a political community. (Note: His discussion of Indigenous societies also reflects a criticism of the excesses of 1793, which had nearly cost him his own life. Rejecting both the revolutionary cult of classical antiquity and aspirations to return to an imagined state of primitive purity, he described Indigenous society as a form of "terrorist democracy" – an allusion to the Montagnard Convention. Neither the Ancients nor the "savages", whom he constantly compared, should, in his view, serve as political models for the future.) He was convinced of the benefits of sedentism and of civilization as a protective enclosure against a hostile natural world. To him, Indigenous peoples seemed destined either to disappear or to be assimilated.

His hostility toward Indigenous customs stood in marked contrast to the eighteenth-century ideal of the noble savage. He dismissed the notion as the fantasy of people "who have never left the corner of their own hearth," directing particular criticism at Jean-Jacques Rousseau, whose thought he described as "a world of abstractions" and whose life, he argued, had been "almost as foreign to the society in which he was born as to that of the savages."

Volney also took aim at François-René de Chateaubriand. Referring to the pederasty that he claimed existed among the Choctaw and the Chickasaw, he mischievously remarked that "those worthy people would be greatly in need of the missionary from Atala."

== Adviser to Napoleon ==
Volney landed at Bordeaux in July 1798 and returned to Paris. At Auteuil, Madame Helvétius received in her salon the Idéologues, among them several of Volney's colleagues at the National Institute: Destutt de Tracy, Cabanis, Daunou, Garat, Lakanal, Andrieux, Ginguené, and Jean-Baptiste Say.

In September, he travelled to Craon to settle the estate of his father, who had died in the spring of 1796. He sold all the property he had inherited and purchased a large agricultural estate at Pringy, east of Paris.

Volney followed the Egyptian campaign closely. News of the expedition became increasingly scarce after the Battle of the Nile, causing widespread concern in France. At the request of La Révellière, he published an article in Le Moniteur universel on 21 November 1798, analysing the difficult situation facing Bonaparte's army. He dismissed as absurd the speculation, circulated by certain newspapers, that Bonaparte might march on India to drive out the British. Instead, he outlined a possible route back to France through Syria, Turkey – including an entry into Constantinople – and the Balkans.

On 27 November, he anonymously contributed a second article to Le Moniteur universel, presenting a fictional conversation between Bonaparte and "several muftis and imams" inside the Great Pyramid of Giza. Seated upon the granite sarcophagus that had once contained the mummy of Khufu, the French general addressed his Muslim audience:

"Glory be to Allah. Muhammad is His prophet, and I am among his friends."

Claiming that he had "curbed the pride" of the Pope "by diminishing his temporal possessions", he appealed to them:

"Encourage trade with the French in your lands […] and keep away from you the islanders of Albion, accursed among the children of Isa."

This piece of propaganda, which misled some of Napoleon's later biographers, (Note: For example, Henri Guillemin treated it as an authentic historical source, without mentioning its fictional character, in a lecture broadcast by the Radio Télévision Suisse in 1968.) depicted the Egyptians as expressing profound reverence for the "invincible general [...] sent by God and favoured by Muhammad."

=== The Coup of 18 Brumaire ===
In October 1799, Bonaparte landed at Saint-Raphaël and returned triumphantly to Paris. A few days after his arrival, he summoned Volney, who thereafter became a frequent visitor to his residence on the Rue de la Victoire.

Volney was involved in the preparations for the Coup of 18 Brumaire. (Note: After the coup, Bonaparte received Volney at the Luxembourg Palace, together with Talleyrand and Pierre-Louis Roederer, who later described the meeting, in order to thank them, in the name of the nation, for their decisive assistance. The extent of Volney's personal involvement nevertheless remains difficult to assess. His rapid disillusionment under the Consulate led him to remain discreet about a conspiracy in which he later regretted having taken part.) His familiarity with parliamentary circles proved valuable to the general, since the institutions of the French Directory were largely staffed by former colleagues from the National Constituent Assembly. (Note: Among them were Louis-Nicolas Lemercier, who, as President of the Council of Ancients, played a crucial role in the success of the coup; Mathieu-Augustin Cornet, a long-standing acquaintance of Volney from Nantes whose actions on 18 Brumaire proved decisive; as well as other supporters of Bonaparte in the Council of Ancients, including Claude Ambroise Régnier and Jean-Barthélemy Le Couteulx de Canteleu.) His connections within Madame Helvétius's circle also proved useful: Cabanis, then a deputy in the Council of Five Hundred, delivered an important speech on 19 Brumaire in support of the coup.

The Idéologues of Auteuil enthusiastically welcomed the new regime. To them, Bonaparte – himself a member of the National Institute – embodied order and moderation. Volney hoped that the general would revive the spirit of the National Constituent Assembly, governing as a citizen in the manner of the American president George Washington.

When Cambacérès was appointed Second Consul, the office of Third Consul was offered to Volney. He declined, citing ill health. Wishing to preserve his independence, he also refused the post of Minister of the Interior. (Note: "Tell the First Consul that he is far too skilful a coachman for me to hitch myself to his carriage. He will want to drive too fast, and a single unruly horse may send the coachman, the carriage, and the horses each in a different direction.") He eventually accepted a seat in the Senate on 24 December.

During the early years of the Consulate, Volney exercised a real influence behind the scenes. He became a regular guest at the Château de Malmaison, where Bonaparte enjoyed dining with learned senators such as Gaspard Monge and Pierre-Simon Laplace. The philosopher also formed a close friendship with Joséphine de Beauharnais and her daughter Hortense de Beauharnais. (Note: Volney became one of Joséphine's confidants. According to a family tradition, Bonaparte even briefly considered arranging a marriage between him and Hortense de Beauharnais.) Some contemporaries regarded his relationship with the First Consul as excessively deferential, (Note: Pierre-Louis Roederer described Volney as "the most ridiculous pedant in France." Louis-Nicolas Lemercier, quoted by Charles-Augustin Sainte-Beuve, recounted a revealing scene in which Volney, listening raptly to Bonaparte, took up the latter's cup of scalding coffee and held it until he judged it cool enough to drink. Volney was deeply concerned for Bonaparte's health and frequently advised him on matters of diet and sleep. In a letter to the Viscount of Noailles dated 11 August 1800, he wrote that the fate of France and Europe depended upon the health of the thirty-one-year-old First Consul, expressing concern that he might share the fate of Alexander the Great, who had died at the age of thirty-two.) although he never descended into servility and retained a frankness that would eventually contribute to his fall from favour.

=== Break with Bonaparte ===
Volney's relationship with the First Consul deteriorated as Bonaparte's increasingly authoritarian ambitions became apparent. He disapproved of the restrictions placed upon freedom of the press, particularly the decree of 17 January 1800, issued at the very beginning of the Consulate, which effectively silenced the Parisian newspapers. It was only a short distance from his residence on Rue Saint-Nicaise that the Infernal Machine exploded on 24 December 1800 as Bonaparte's carriage passed by. Although the attack had been carried out by royalists, it was attributed to the Jacobin opposition, which was subjected to severe repression.

Volney opposed the general amnesties granted to aristocratic émigrés. Whilst he repeatedly intervened on behalf of the Viscount of Noailles – known as "Noailles of the Night" in reference to the Night of 4 August 1789 – whom he had met again in the United States, he viewed with dissatisfaction the return of certain arrogant noblemen, such as La Galissonnière, his former colleague in the representation of Anjou. He also regarded with unease the court taking shape at the Tuileries Palace, where, as he put it, "the civil pageantry merely continued the military pageantry." Nevertheless, he remained broadly supportive of the government's policies. In July 1801, he wrote to Thomas Jefferson: "The changes that have taken place among us during the past twenty months are almost fabulous: we were in a state of putrid dissolution both at home and abroad, and we are now more reconstituted than ever. [...] Our greatest wounds, those of finance and public safety, are healing before our eyes. The special tribunals have produced all the good we expected from them. One evil remains – that of the priesthood – and the reaction in that direction is astonishing for its hypocrisy and fanaticism."

It was the Concordat of 1801, concluded with the Holy See in the summer of 1801, that brought about a decisive rupture between Volney and Bonaparte. The use of religion for political purposes outraged him, and he made no attempt to conceal his views. During an argument, Bonaparte defended the Concordat by claiming that the French people desired reconciliation with the Catholic Church. Volney replied that the people likewise desired the return of the House of Bourbon, provoking the First Consul's anger, who reportedly assaulted him. (Note: The incident was described in a letter written on 4 November 1801 by Cardinal Maury, who reported that Bonaparte merely "turned his back" on Volney after the exchange. In his memoirs, François-Yves Besnard instead claimed that Bonaparte kicked him in the stomach.)

Republicans attached to the prerogatives of the legislative power protested against the increasingly monarchical direction taken by the regime. Bonaparte grew impatient with this minority of opponents, these "Idéologues", (Note: The term idéologie, meaning the science of ideas, had been coined in 1795 by Antoine Destutt de Tracy. Bonaparte employed idéologue as a pejorative label for his opponents in the legislative assemblies, dismissing them as empty and pompous theorists. Referring explicitly to Charles-François Dupuis and Volney, he remarked to François-René de Chateaubriand: "Did not the Idéologues attempt to reduce Christianity to a system of astronomy? Even if that were so, do they imagine they thereby diminish Christianity? If Christianity is the allegory of the movement of the spheres, the geometry of the stars, then these freethinkers, despite themselves, have still left enough grandeur to the infamous thing." (Memoirs from Beyond the Grave).) who had supported him in 1799. Many of them were removed from the Tribunat and the Corps législatif. In January 1803, the National Institute was reorganized by suppressing the Class of Moral and Political Sciences, which had become a centre of opposition to Napoleon. Volney was transferred to the Class of French Language and Literature (the Académie française).

While staying at town of Spa during the summer of 1802, Volney was therefore absent from the vote approving the French Constitution of 1802, which, following the plebiscite establishing the Consulate for Life, effectively brought the French First Republic to an end.

=== Louisiana Purchase ===
Despite their growing disagreements, Napoleon continued to seek Volney's advice, particularly on American affairs. Having secured from Spain the retrocession of Louisiana in 1800, the First Consul launched the Saint-Domingue expedition in an effort to recover control of the colony and secure access to the Mississippi River valley. Volney strongly opposed these colonial ambitions, considering the success of General Charles Leclerc highly improbable. He warned Napoleon: "If you send thirty thousand men to Saint-Domingue, thirty thousand hats will return." The Senator attempted, unsuccessfully, to persuade the First Consul that the Americans would inevitably draw closer to Britain in response to renewed French imperial ambitions.

Events soon confirmed his predictions. In 1802, the French expedition failed to regain control of Saint-Domingue, while Franco-American relations deteriorated. President Thomas Jefferson first dispatched Pierre Samuel du Pont de Nemours to Paris in an attempt at conciliation, then sent James Monroe to assist Ambassador Robert R. Livingston with instructions to negotiate the purchase of New Orleans. Jefferson also entrusted Monroe with a letter for Volney, informing him that although the United States preferred an accommodation with France, it would not exclude an alliance with Britain should negotiations fail.

Napoleon was ultimately forced to abandon his American dream and negotiate the sale of a territory too distant to defend. The Louisiana Purchase was concluded on 30 April 1803. Throughout the negotiations, Volney never hesitated to contradict the First Consul directly, whose increasingly authoritarian temperament found his "austere frankness" (Note: Expression used by Pierre-Louis Ginguené.) ever less tolerable. Writing to Jefferson, Volney lamented "the loss of so many men, so much wealth, and so much time", and, as the Peace of Amiens collapsed, concluded: "Poor Europe, theatre of carnage and plaything of conquerors!" By then, his last illusions about Bonaparte had vanished.

After the death of Madame Helvétius, Volney withdrew from parisian salon society and lived alone in a small Egyptian-style house that he had built in 1802.

On 9 August 1803, on the banks of the Seine, he witnessed, together with Gaspard de Prony and Lazare Carnot, the first trial of Robert Fulton's steamboat. That same evening he was seized by a violent fever. He spent the final years of the Consulate convalescing in the south of France.

== Later life ==
=== The Empire ===
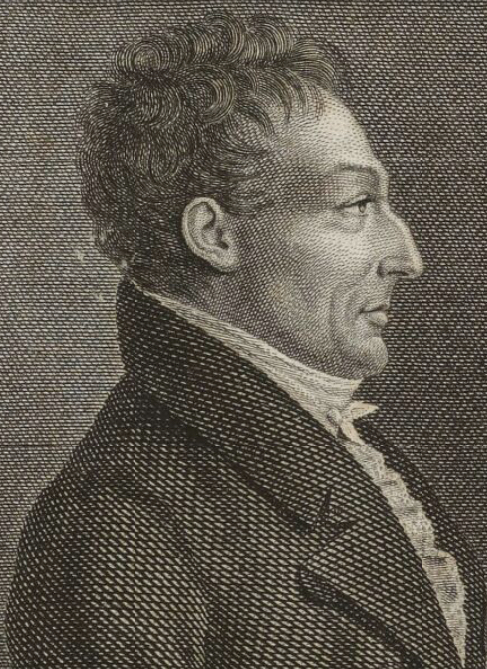
Volney, drawn by Pierre Chasselat.

Outraged by the arrest of General Jean Victor Marie Moreau, (Note: Volney had known Moreau since 1788, during the period of La Sentinelle du Peuple. Although Moreau had reluctantly cooperated in the Coup of 18 Brumaire, he had been sidelined in 1801 and had become a leading figure in the opposition to the First Consul. He enjoyed considerable popularity among the Idéologues, who were themselves monitored by Claude Fauriel on behalf of the Minister of Police, Joseph Fouché. Hated by Bonaparte, Moreau was falsely accused of participating in the royalist conspiracy of Generals Charles Pichegru and Georges Cadoudal, who planned to assassinate the First Consul. Arrested on 15 February 1804, Moreau became the focus of widespread sympathy, and the Idéologues even considered helping him escape. Owing to the lack of convincing evidence and the support he enjoyed in Paris, he was sentenced to only two years' imprisonment, much to Bonaparte's frustration – "They've sentenced him as if he had stolen a handkerchief!" – before ultimately being allowed to go into exile in the United States.) and by the execution of the Duke of Enghien, Volney was among the small number of senators who opposed the establishment of the First French Empire, (Note: Anticipating the change of regime, he informed Thomas Jefferson of it in a letter dated 28 April 1804, entrusted to Robert Fulton shortly before the latter's departure from France: "You will learn that the Senate will have voted in favour of hereditary succession.") although he did not vote against it, unlike Abbé Grégoire, Garat, and Charles Lambrechts.

When the Constitution of the Year XII was adopted on 18 May 1804, formally bringing the French First Republic to an end, Volney submitted his resignation. Irritated, the Emperor refused to accept it, and a few days later the Senate decreed that no senator would be permitted to resign. Disappointed by the chamber's servility and venality, Volney thereafter confined himself to an almost complete abstention from its proceedings. The Senate, far from safeguarding constitutional liberties, had "preserved nothing but itself."

He wrote to Thomas Jefferson:

"In this great historical drama, fate has granted me a seat in a small box from which I can contemplate the spectacle with relative tranquillity. I confess, however, that being more fond of comedy than of tragedy, I would gladly exchange this long tragedy for some little play."

Volney watched the Grande Armée conquer continental Europe with little enthusiasm. Already in his lectures on history at the École normale in 1795, he had shown a certain disdain for dreams of military glory.

From its foundation in 1804, Volney was a member of the Celtic Academy, which met at the Louvre Palace. He hoped to make the institution the French counterpart of the Asiatic Society, of which he had been a member since 1797. (Note: Although elected on 28 September 1797, he did not learn of his appointment until 1802, after the Peace of Amiens restored maritime communications. He was particularly touched by this distinction because it had been conferred by British Orientalists during wartime.) He helped devise a questionnaire intended to map the use of regional dialects throughout the French departments. His aim was to record local languages before they disappeared, just as he had earlier urged the American Philosophical Society to do for Native American languages.

Volney's health kept him away from Paris for much of the time. In addition to his farm at Pringy, he purchased an eleven-hectare estate at Sarcelles in 1806 for 70,000 francs. He intended to make it a model farm, convinced that a wisely managed estate was the foundation of a citizen's happiness. Volney raised sheep, cattle, and horses, cultivated vineyards, personally pruned a variety of fruit trees, and grew rare flowers in his garden. The Dutch diplomat Isaac Titsingh supplied him with seeds and young plants.

During his infrequent appearances at the Luxembourg Palace, he belonged, together with Cabanis, Destutt de Tracy, Garat, Grégoire, Sieyès, Lanjuinais, and Lambrechts, to the irreducible minority of opponents tolerated by Napoleon, who mockingly referred to them as the "sulkers of Auteuil".

Nevertheless, the Emperor appointed him a Commander of the Legion of Honour on 14 June 1804 and created him a Count of the Empire on 26 April 1808.

Arms of Count Volney: Sable, two ruined columns Or surmounted by a swallow Argent.

Napoleon gave a further sign of his personal regard in 1810, when he sent his own physician, Jean-Nicolas Corvisart, to treat the philosopher after he had been gored by a bull on his farm at Sarcelles.

=== The fall of Napoleon ===
As early as June 1808, Volney was among the twenty-two senators implicated in the republican conspiracy of General Malet, a member of the secret society known as the Philadelphes. The plot was uncovered by the Prefect of Police of Paris, who had Malet arrested. Preoccupied with the Uprising in Spain, Napoleon preferred to suppress the affair quietly, and none of the suspected senators was prosecuted. (Note: Cabanis, who was named among the alleged conspirators in the police report, had been interred in the Panthéon on the Emperor's orders only a few weeks earlier.)

On 23 October 1812, while the Grande Armée was leaving Moscow to begin the retreat from Russia, General Malet took advantage of the Emperor's absence to launch a coup. Claiming that Napoleon had died on 7 October, he announced the formation of a provisional government composed of fifteen members. Volney was one of the four senators named, alongside Garat, Lambrechts, and Destutt de Tracy. The coup failed within a few hours, and its principal organizers were executed.

In 1814, France was invaded by the Sixth Coalition. On the day after the Battle of Paris, the Senate appointed Talleyrand as head of a provisional government. Volney abstained from voting in favour of Napoleon's deposition. On 4 June, Louis XVIII made him a Peer of France.

In March 1815, Napoleon's return from Elba initially caused him anxiety, prompting him to leave Paris. He was reassured, however, by the presence of liberals such as Benjamin Constant and Lazare Carnot among the Emperor's advisers and quietly returned to the capital. Volney took no part in the Hundred Days, an adventure he regarded with deep disapproval: "What is that wild beast coming back for? France will pay dearly for what little good he has done her."

=== Marriage and misogynistic views ===
No romantic relationship is known in Volney's life before his fifties, apart from his youthful attachment to his cousin Charlotte Gigault de La Giraudais (1766–1864), then still an adolescent, whose marriage he learned of with disappointment upon his return from Egypt.

His travel narratives, both in the Near East and in America, reveal an uneasy relationship with women. In Virginia, the wives and daughters of the great landowners appeared to him even prouder than their husbands and fathers. He nonetheless appreciated the contemplative silence of the American women he encountered, which contrasted with the incessant chatter of French women. Of Native American women, he wrote: "I do not deny that some may be attractive, as certain travellers claim. While travelling, appetite often lends flavour to dishes that would seem tasteless elsewhere."

During the French Revolution, he argued that women's clubs and political associations were "regrettable institutions of harmful consequences". He also regarded the excessive female luxury displayed in Paris as "one of the principal sources of corruption in the morals of a people".

Pierre-Louis Roederer recorded in his diary, under 10 December 1799, an exchange between Volney and Napoleon concerning the arrest of prostitutes in the Palais-Royal. "These young ladies wish to get loose again", Volney joked. Amused, Bonaparte replied that he was speaking like "an old bachelor".

He was not insensible to what he described as the feminine charms of "freshness and good health". Solitude increasingly affected his spirits and, some thirty years after his youthful disappointment, he married his cousin Charlotte on 6 November 1810, following the death of her husband the previous year. Contrary to established custom, he did not seek Napoleon's permission, the Emperor preferring the leading dignitaries of his regime to marry women drawn from the old nobility.

=== The search for an ancient chronology ===
Volney had been fascinated by what he called "the arithmetic of history" ever since his conversations with Baron d'Holbach and his reading of Nicolas Fréret in the late 1770s. In 1790, he contributed a Chronology of the Twelve Centuries Preceding the Crossing of Xerxes I into Greece to Charles-Joseph Panckoucke's Encyclopédie Méthodique.

Throughout the First French Empire, he immersed himself in "the dark ocean of antiquity" in an effort to establish a reliable chronological framework. In 1808, he published a Supplement to Pierre-Henri Larcher's Herodotus, followed the next year by a Chronology of Herodotus, Conforming to His Text, in Refutation of the Hypotheses of His Translators and Commentators.

At the beginning of 1814, his New Researches on Ancient History appeared. This ambitious work of scholarship (Note: Joseph Van Praet, curator of the Imperial Library, allowed Volney to borrow books that his poor health prevented him from consulting in person. He immersed himself in fragments of Agatharchides, Sanchuniathon, Alexander Polyhistor, and George Syncellus.) sought to reconstruct, as far back as possible, the history of the pre-Hellenistic Near East. (Note: "What! In less than a century the human mind has solved countless enigmas of nature in astronomy, physics, chemistry, and so many other sciences, and yet it cannot unravel the riddles that it has itself created in the narratives of history! Whence this strange inconsistency?")

The first part was devoted to the Hebrew Bible, which Volney examined without regard for its sacred status. His study relied in particular on Josephus's Antiquities of the Jews. He began with the period of the kings – from Saul to the destruction of the First Temple – before working backwards. He regarded it as beyond dispute, (Note: Here Volney relied on the work of the biblical scholar Richard Simon.) contrary to traditional belief, that Moses was not the author of the Pentateuch. While the ritual and legal prescriptions contained in Exodus, Leviticus, Numbers, and Deuteronomy might indeed go back to Moses, he maintained that the historical and chronological sections had been composed by the high priest Hilkiah during the reign of Josiah.

The Book of Genesis, which describes a period before the Jewish people existed – at least in the passages preceding the appearance of Abraham – appeared to him to have been entirely inspired by Chaldean myths. The story of the Flood, for example, ultimately derived from the legend of King Ziusudra, the tenth and last antediluvian patriarch, like Noah. In support of this argument, he cited the work of Berossus, preserved in fragments through Alexander Polyhistor and George Syncellus. Volney dated the construction of the Tower of Babel to the end of the 4th millennium BC. (Note: This estimate roughly corresponds to the construction of the Anu ziggurat in the city of Uruk.)

In Volney's view, the patriarch Abraham (Note: He drew parallels between Abraham and Brahma, and between Sarah and Saraswati.) was not a historical individual but a mythological and astrological figure, "like Osiris, Hermes, Manu, or Krishna". The biblical narrative acquired historical plausibility only from the Book of Exodus, which he dated to the 15th century BC, and continuous chronological reliability only from the time of Eli onward.

He concluded his discussion of the Hebrew Bible by declaring that "the books of the Jewish people have no right to govern the annals of other nations, nor to enlighten us exclusively concerning remote antiquity." The work was placed on the Index Librorum Prohibitorum by the Catholic Church in 1826.

The remainder of the New Researches, weighed down by numerous repetitions and digressions, attempted to reconstruct and reconcile the chronologies of the Sabaeans, Assyrians, Lydians, Medes, Persians, Babylonians, and Egyptians. Among other subjects, Volney examined the Dendera zodiac and the succession of the astrological ages resulting from the precession of the equinoxes.

Published at the beginning of the nineteenth century – before the development of modern archaeology and the decipherment of Egyptian hieroglyphs and cuneiform – his conclusions have been almost entirely superseded. He maintained, for example, that the construction of the Great Pyramid of Giza was contemporary with the Trojan War, which he dated to the 11th century BC, some fifteen centuries after the reign of Khufu.

Volney also entered into one of the chronological controversies of his age: the date of the solar eclipse predicted by Thales. Combining the account of Herodotus with the astronomical tables of Alexandre Guy Pingré, he mistakenly dated the event to 3 February 625 BC, although Thales had not yet been born. It is now generally accepted that the correct date was that given by Pliny the Elder – 28 May 585 BC.

=== The Bourbon Restoration ===
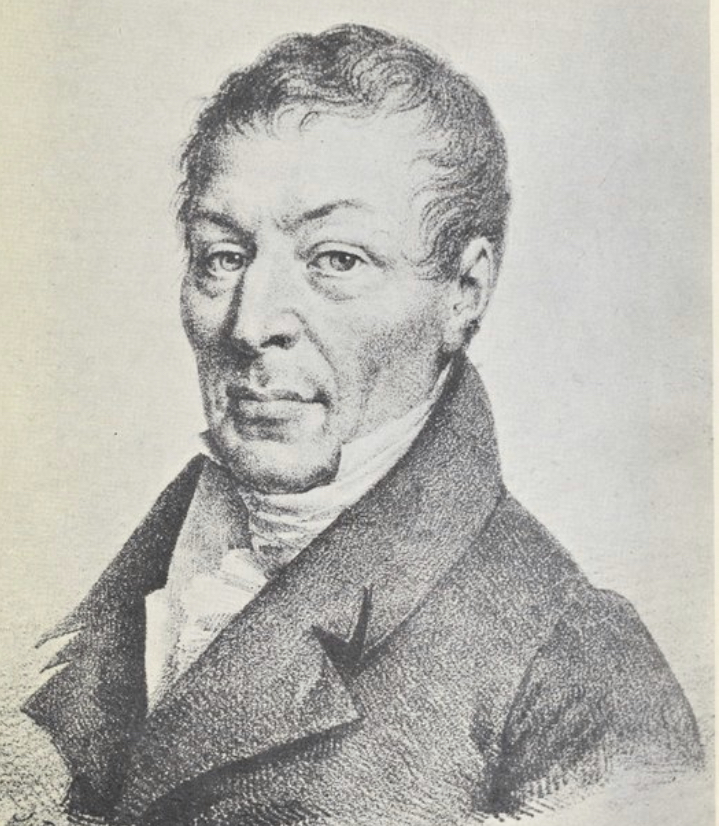
Portrait of Volney by Boilly (1815).

Volney regarded Louis XVIII not as a divine-right monarch, but rather as a kind of supreme magistrate. (Note: On 17 October 1814, he resigned from the Celtic Academy (by then renamed the Society of Antiquaries of France), whose permanent secretary, Antoine-Jean Saint-Martin, increasingly lavished expressions of devotion upon "Louis the Desired" and sought the King's patronage.) His allegiance to the restored monarchy was therefore conditional: he hoped that the Charter of 1814 would guarantee individual liberties. In recognition of his loyalty during the Hundred Days, the King confirmed his title of Peer of France on 19 August 1815 and made it hereditary.

He watched helplessly as the Catholic Church regained its former influence, denounced the squandering of public funds on behalf of the nobility and the clergy, and deplored the consequences of the Congress of Vienna, which stripped France of almost all the territories it had acquired since the French Revolution. In November 1815, he refused to sit in judgment at the trial of Marshal Ney.

The Ultra-royalist majority in the "Chambre introuvable", eager to restore the Ancien Régime – "Versailles for some, and for others their old keeps" – appeared to him little more than fanatics. His appearances in the Chamber remained as infrequent and silent as they had been during his years in the Conservative Senate.

Volney was convinced that the political emancipation of the people could only be achieved through the education of children. A supporter of the monitorial system introduced from Great Britain, he financed the establishment of a school in his native town of Craon based on that method, where around one hundred pupils received instruction. He considered founding similar schools in the Candé region, but the project encountered opposition from the clergy, who were anxious to preserve their exclusive authority over the education of children.

==== The question of the royal coronation ====
Louis XVIII, who was sixty years old at the time of the Restoration and largely incapacitated by ill health, declined to undergo the traditional coronation ceremony at Reims Cathedral.

Volney took up his pen to express the scepticism and irony with which liberals viewed this archaic institution, which had been borrowed from the ancient Hebrews. In 1819, he published History of Samuel, Inventor of the Coronation of Kings.

The work presents two Americans: Josiah Nibbler, a Quaker travelling through the Holy Land, (Note: Volney also took the opportunity to aim several barbs at Chateaubriand, who had boasted of not knowing Arabic ("The traveller who cannot converse is a deaf-mute who communicates only by gestures.") and who had travelled to the Holy Land as a pilgrim ("In Jerusalem I took care not to become a pilgrim; otherwise I should have fallen prey to Turkish greed and, what is just as bad, to Christian hypocrisy disguised as mendicancy. I had the good fortune to leave that hotbed of superstition and imposture unharmed.").) writes to a friend in Philadelphia, Kaleb Listener. Rereading the Hebrew Bible in light of his own experience in the Near East and applying to the sacred text "the principles of our modern historical criticism", he offers a new interpretation of the origins of the Kingdom of Israel.

Volney stripped the biblical heroes of their aura of mystery, reducing Samuel, Saul, David, and the founders of the "Hebrew horde" to the status of Bedouins like those he had observed in Ottoman Syria. To him, these legendary figures possessed no inherent grandeur: their actions were inspired not by divine revelation but by personal ambition and political calculation. Behind the "veil of prodigies and wonders that surrounds him", Samuel had, in Volney's view, spent his life exploiting the ignorance and credulity of the people.

He retraced the prophet's life from his childhood in the household of the high priest Eli, where he was initiated into the secrets of the "priestly corporation", through his manoeuvres to exclude Eli's sons from the succession, to his rise to power after the Philistines captured the Ark of the Covenant. Samuel initially intended his own two sons to succeed him, but, like Eli's sons before them, they proved corrupt and incapable. (Note: "Fathers attain power through great labour and care; children, born into abundance, surrender themselves to the vices and excesses fostered by prosperity.") The tribal chiefs then asked him to appoint a king, following the example of neighbouring nations. Samuel anointed Saul, "a brave warrior" whom he could easily manipulate, before eventually deposing him by secretly anointing the shepherd David.

Volney concluded his pamphlet with a series of rhetorical questions:

"If, among the Hebrews, royal anointing transferred the priestly character to the king, does a French king who has himself crowned intend thereby to partake of the priesthood? If a King of France acknowledges that any priest has the right to crown him today, does he not also acknowledge that the same priest may crown another tomorrow, in imitation of the prophet Samuel? By what right can any individual crown a King of France? Does that right come from the Bishop of Rome? (Note: Volney remarked, with reference to Napoleon, that "even a papal coronation did not possess the power to avert the downfall of a mighty but illiberal government.") Then the King of France is the vassal of a foreign prince. Is this right conferred upon the priest by the king himself? Then the king grants rights to himself. [...] If a coronation is a matter of state, why is it left entirely to arbitrary choice? If it is merely a ceremonial amusement, why should the people pay more for it than for a day's hunting? [...] When the whole morality of the Gospel is one of humility and simplicity, why is its practice nothing but pomp and extravagance?"

=== "The Universal Alphabet" ===
Towards the end of his life, Volney returned to the ambitious project he had first undertaken in 1795 with Simplification of the Oriental Languages. In 1819, he published The European Alphabet Applied to the Asian Languages.

Believing that the language barrier, which hindered trade and the circulation of knowledge, resulted largely from the multiplicity of writing systems – an "unnecessary redundancy of so many different signs for what is essentially the same underlying structure" – he argued that some fifty symbols, comprising around twenty vowels and thirty-two consonants, would suffice to represent the pronunciation of the world's languages, thereby greatly facilitating their study.

As the basis for his "universal alphabet", Volney adopted the Latin alphabet. To represent foreign sounds, he supplemented it with Greek letters, original characters of his own invention, and various diacritics. As an illustration of his method, he published Simplified Hebrew the same year. He further explained his ideas in a Discourse on the Philosophical Study of Languages, delivered before the Académie française on 7 December 1819. (Note: In this address he criticized the neo-classical education in France, which was confined to the study of Greek and Latin: "Our exclusive admiration for Greek and Latin is nothing more than an unthinking tribute paid in childhood to the scholastic vanity of our teachers.")

The sinologist Abel-Rémusat challenged the practical value of Volney's system in the Journal des savants, arguing that the proposed alphabet was incomplete and that it was illusory to imagine it could ever be adopted by peoples deeply attached to their literary and religious traditions. (Note: Volney himself attached little importance to those traditions: "An ancient prejudice vainly extols Oriental literature. Good taste and reason attest that its productions contain no substantial body of instruction or positive science: history recounts only fables, poetry only hyperbole; philosophy teaches only sophistry, medicine only recipes, metaphysics only absurdities. Natural history, physics, chemistry, and higher mathematics scarcely even have names there.") Such a reform, Abel-Rémusat concluded, would require "more centuries of sustained effort directed towards the same goal than past experience allows us to suppose."

Sainte-Beuve likewise criticized Volney's universal alphabet:

"Instead of leaving these languages as they are, of approaching them historically and by families, and of respecting their individual genius and distinctive character, he seeks to treat them rather as he treated religions, forcing them beneath the yoke of an artificial unity that strips them of their nature and identity. [...] This practical-minded man, through his stubborn adherence to mechanical methods of analysis, has on this occasion plainly pursued a chimera.". (Note: Sainte-Beuve wrote that the Ideologues "aim too much at pruning the tree before them and shaping it methodically," instead of regarding languages "as the product of slow growth, a historical development resulting from a thousand accidental circumstances.")

Volney's project found a measure of fulfilment in 1888 with the creation of the International Phonetic Alphabet. A century after his death, the Turkish alphabet reform under Mustafa Kemal Atatürk marked another posthumous success for his ideas.

=== Death and funeral ===
In 1818, Volney purchased a townhouse with a large garden at 73 Rue de Vaugirard, not far from the Luxembourg Palace.

On 31 March 1820, in the aftermath of the Duke of Berry's assassination, the Ultra-royalists secured the restoration of press censorship in the Chamber of Peers. On 2 March, Volney had sent a letter of protest to Le Constitutionnel. It was perhaps the only occasion on which he found himself in agreement with Chateaubriand.

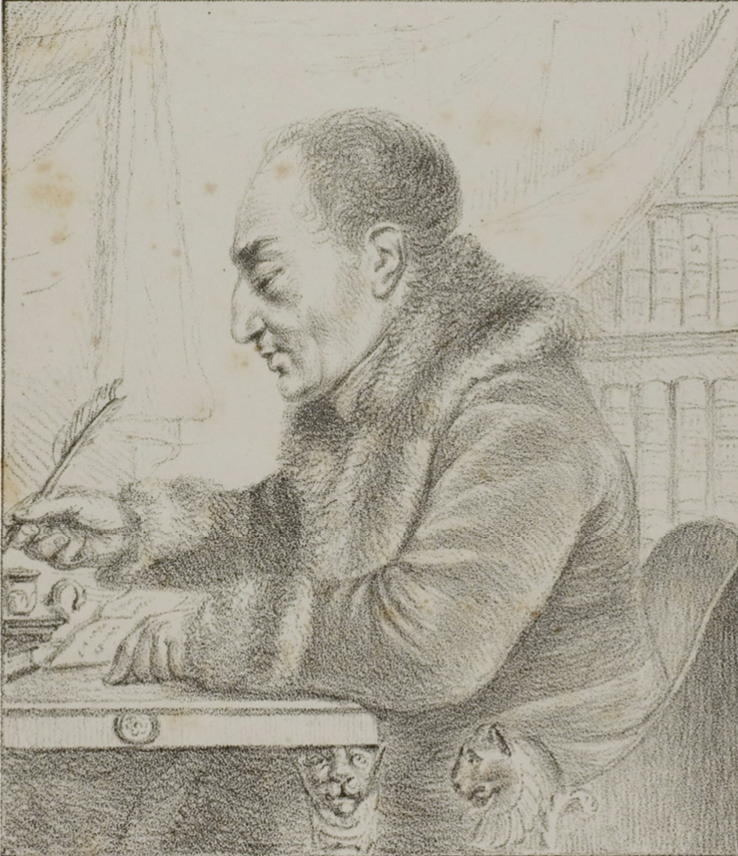
Volney at the end of his life (lithograph by Vivant Denon, Art Institute of Chicago).

Sensing that his strength was failing, Volney dictated his will on 22 April. (Note: He bequeathed his properties to his nephews and to his wife's grandchildren, while naming his wife universal heir. He also left 20,000 francs to a tenant farmer on his estate at Pringy and established a capital fund of 24,000 francs, to be invested by the Institut de France in order to finance a prize in philology. He appointed Count Daru as his executor, who also inherited his library.) He died at his home three days later, on 25 April 1820, "quite decidedly an unbeliever", according to the testimony of his friend Abbé Grégoire.

Although he had been a prominent critic of Christianity, the Church granted him a religious funeral, held on 29 April at Saint-Sulpice. According to Jean Gaulmier, his status as a Peer of France may have contributed to that decision. Volney was buried in Père Lachaise Cemetery in the presence of numerous distinguished figures.

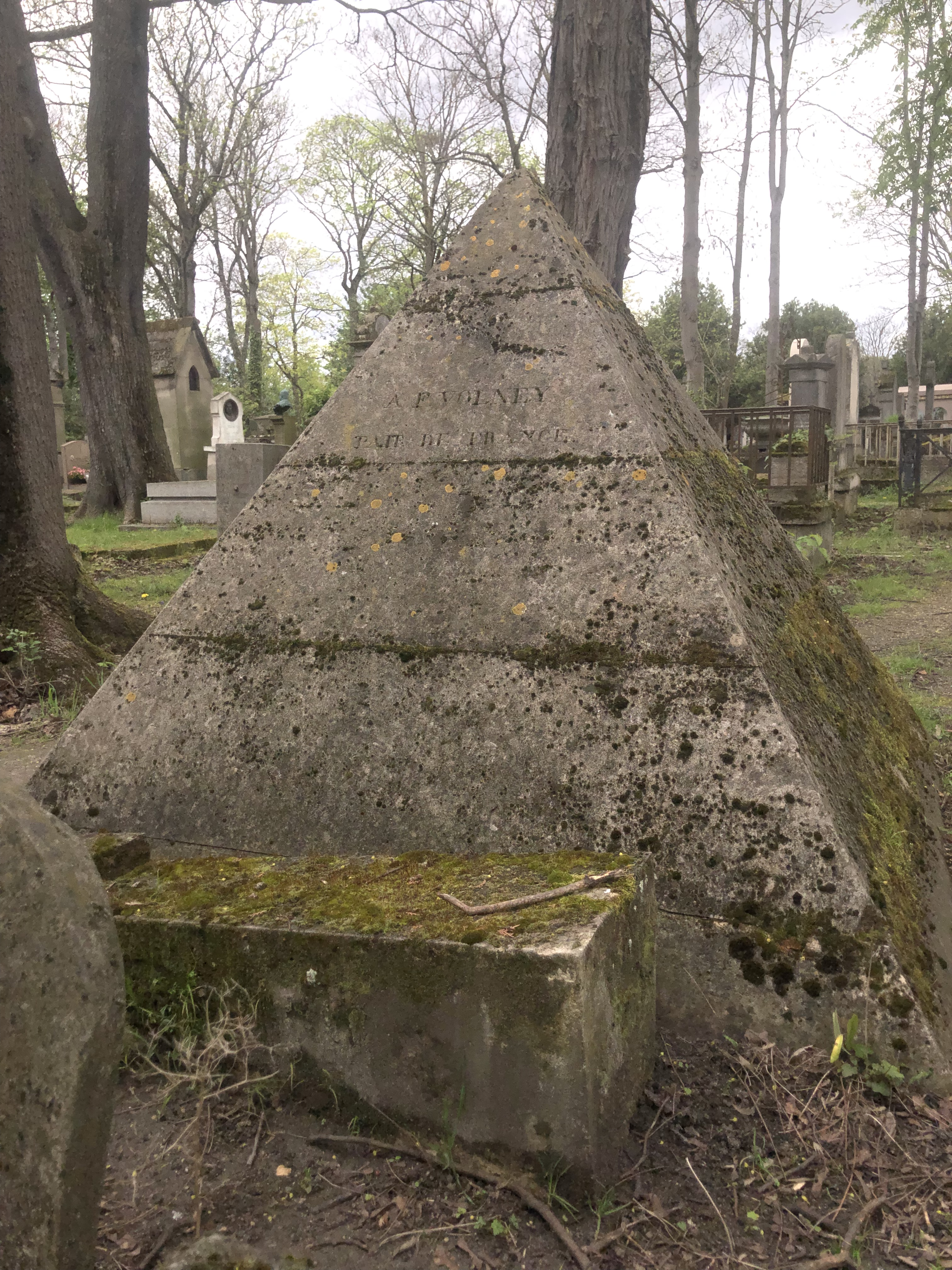
Volney's grave in Division 41 of Père Lachaise Cemetery (a square pyramid measuring 1.8 metres on each side and 1.5 metres in height).

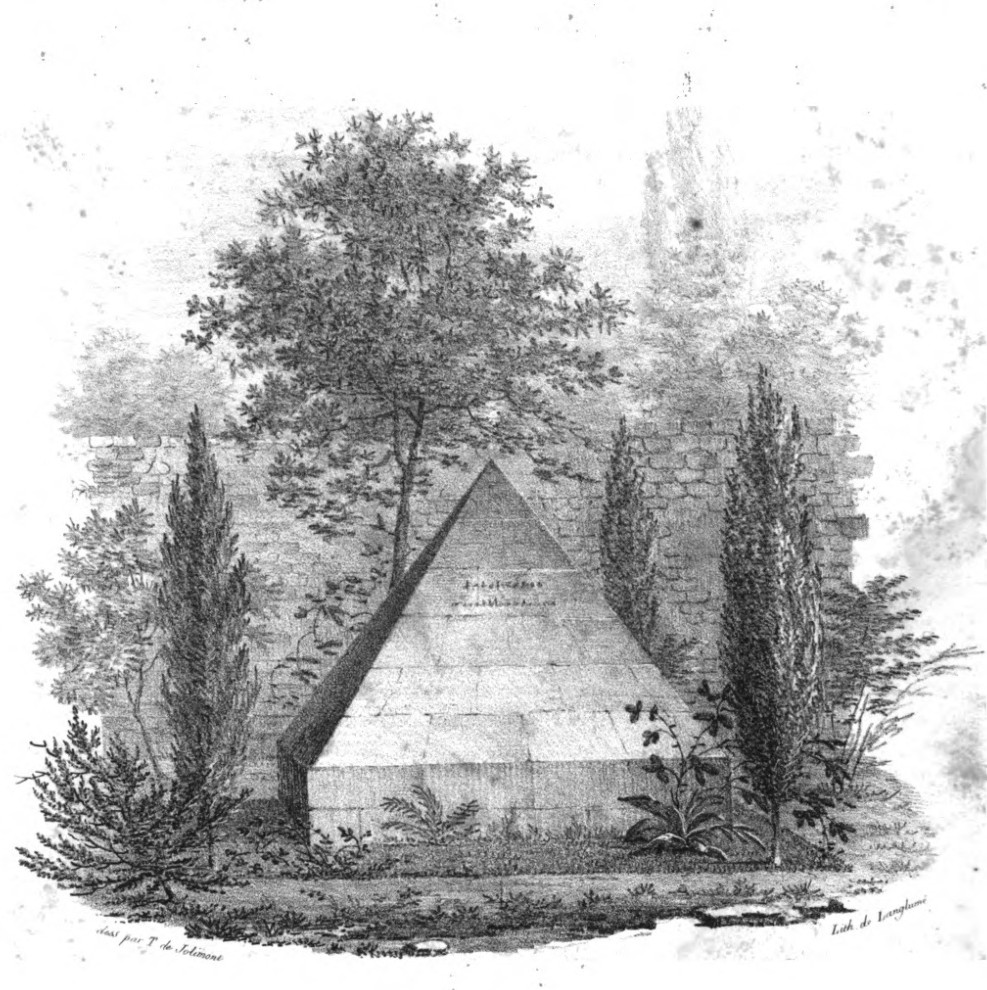
Illustration by Théodore de Jolimont from Les mausolées français (1821).

Count Daru paid tribute to Volney in a speech (Note: The eulogy was published in Le Moniteur and the Revue encyclopédique, reprinted as the preface to the octodecimo edition of The Ruins, and translated into English and Spanish.) before the Chamber of Peers on 14 June, while the Marquess of Pastoret, who succeeded Volney in Seat 24 of the Académie française, honoured his memory in his reception address on 24 August.

== Legacy ==
=== In France ===
In accordance with his last wishes, the Institut de France established the Prix Volney, a prize in comparative philology financed by a fund that Volney had specifically endowed for that purpose. The seven-member committee responsible for awarding the prize met for the first time in the spring of 1822. The Prix Volney continues to be awarded by the Institut de France, on the recommendation of the Académie des Inscriptions et Belles-Lettres, for an outstanding work in comparative philology.

Since 1879, a street has borne his name in Paris, in the 2nd arrondissement. At No. 7 stood for many years the Cercle Volney, an artistic and literary club, one of whose members is the target of the Duke of Guermantes's sarcasm in Marcel Proust's In Search of Lost Time.

Other streets bearing his name can be found in Lyon, Angers, Rennes, Brest, and Clermont-Ferrand. In his native town of Craon, a square and a secondary school have also been named in his honour.

A Masonic lodge bearing his name was founded in Laval in 1911.

=== In the English-speaking world ===
- In Mary Shelley's novel Frankenstein; or, The Modern Prometheus (1818), the Creature secretly listens as a French family reads aloud from The Ruins. Through this work, he gains his first understanding of the history of civilizations and the world's religions.
- The town of Volney, New York (in Oswego County, New York) was named after Volney during his lifetime, in 1811.
- Volney, Iowa, in Allamakee County, has been recorded under that name since 1853.
- A third locality bearing his name is located in Grayson County, Virginia.
- The Volney is a residential building on 74th Street, in the Upper East Side of Manhattan, not far from the French Consulate General. The poet Dorothy Parker died there in 1967.

== Publications ==
=== Journalism ===
Volney contributed to the Revue encyclopédique and published several articles in the Moniteur universel during the French Revolution.

=== Works ===
==== 1781–1789 ====
- 1781: Memoir on the Chronology of Herodotus (Mémoire sur la Chronologie d'Hérodote).
- 1787: Travels in Syria and Egypt during the Years 1783, 1784, and 1785 (Voyage en Syrie et en Égypte, pendant les années 1783, 1784 & 1785), Paris: Volland and Dessenne. (Available on Gallica: vol. 1 and vol. 2.)
- 1788:
  - Considerations on the Present War of the Turks (Considérations sur la guerre actuelle des Turcs), London (online).
  - On the Conditions Necessary for the Legality of the Estates-General (Des Conditions nécessaires à la légalité des États généraux), Paris.
  - Letter from C.-F. de Volney to the Count of S...t (Lettre de M. C.-F. de Volney à M. le comte de S...t.), Paris, 1788.

==== 1790–1799 ====
- 1790: Chronology of the Twelve Centuries Preceding Xerxes' Crossing into Greece (Chronologie des douze siècles antérieurs au passage de Xercès en Grèce).
- 1791: The Ruins, or Meditations on the Revolutions of Empires (Les Ruines ou Méditations sur les Révolutions des Empires), Geneva.
- 1793:
  - The Natural Law, or Catechism of the French Citizen (La loi naturelle ou Catéchisme du Citoyen français), Grenoble.
  - Summary of the Present State of Corsica (Précis de l'état actuel de la Corse) (1793).
- 1794: Simplification of the Oriental Languages, or a New and Easy Method for Learning Arabic, Persian, and Turkish with European Characters (Simplification des langues orientales, ou méthode nouvelle et facile d'apprendre les langues arabe, persane et turque, avec des caractères européens), Paris: Imprimerie de la République, Year III, in octavo (available on Gallica).
- 1795: Letter to Priestley.

==== 1800–1815 ====
- 1803: View of the Climate and Soil of the United States (Tableau du climat et du sol des États-Unis d'Amérique suivi d'éclaircissements sur la Floride, sur la colonie française au Scioto, sur quelques colonies canadiennes et sur les Sauvages), Paris.
- 1805: Report Submitted to the Académie celtique on Professor Pallas's Russian Work, "Comparative Vocabularies of the Languages of the Whole World" (Rapport fait à l'Académie Celtique sur l'ouvrage russe de M. le professeur Pallas. « Vocabulaires comparés des langues de toute la terre »), Paris.
- 1808:
  - New Researches on Ancient History (Recherches nouvelles sur l'histoire ancienne), Paris.
  - Supplement to Larcher's Herodotus (Supplément à l'Hérodote de M. Larcher), Paris.
- 1809: Chronology of Herodotus, in Accordance with His Text, Refuting the Hypotheses of His Translators and Commentators (Chronologie de Hérodote, conforme à son texte, en réfutation des hypothèses de ses traducteurs et de ses commentateurs), Paris: Bossange, 1809; 1821.
- 1813: Statistical Questions for Travellers (Questions de statistique à l'usage des Voyageurs), Paris.

==== 1816–1820, and posthumous works in the 19th century ====
- 1819:
  - History of Samuel, Inventor of the Coronation of Kings (Histoire de Samuel, inventeur du sacre des rois), subtitled A Fragment by an American Traveller (fragment d'un voyageur américain), Paris: Bossange, 1819, 1820, 1822.
  - The European Alphabet Applied to the Asian Languages (L'alfabet européen appliqué aux langues asiatiques), Paris: F. Didot, 1819; second edition, 1826 (1826 edition available on Gallica).
- 1820:
  - Simplified Hebrew (L'Hébreu simplifié par la méthode alfabétique, contenant un premier essai de la grammaire et un plan du dictionnaire écrit sans lettres hébraïques, et cependant conforme à l'hébreu ; avec des vues nouvelles sur l'enseignement des langues orientales), Paris: J.-M. Eberhart, 1820 (1826 edition available on Gallica).
  - Discourse on the Philosophical Study of Languages (Discours sur l'étude philosophique des langues), read before the Academy of Sciences, Paris, 1820.
- 1821–1837:
  - Selected Works (Œuvres choisies), preceded by A Biographical Notice of the Author (Notice sur la vie de l'auteur), by Adolphe Bossange. Includes The Ruins, The Natural Law, and History of Samuel, Inventor of the Coronation of Kings. Paris, 1821; new edition, Lebigre Frères, 1836. A Notice on the Life and Writings of C.-F. Volney (Notice sur la vie et les écrits de C.-F. Volney), also by Adolphe Bossange, appears at the beginning of the Complete Works of Volney (Œuvres complètes de Volney), published by Bossange in eight octavo volumes, Paris; a new, though less complete, edition appeared in Paris in 1837 in large octavo.
- 1822: Lectures on History Delivered at the École Normale in Year III of the French Republic (Leçons d'histoire prononcées à l'École normale, en l'an III de la République française), Paris, 1799.
- 1823: Letters from M. de Volney to Baron Friedrich Melchior Grimm, Followed by the Latter's Reply (Lettres de M. de Volney à M. le baron de Grimm, suivi de la réponse de ce dernier), published by Antoine-Alexandre Barbier, Paris.

=== 20th and 21st centuries ===
- 1954: Complete Works, Preceded by a Notice on the Life and Writings of the Author (Œuvres complètes. Précédées d'une Notice sur la Vie et les Écrits de l'Auteur), Firmin-Didot.
- 2008: General Observations on the Indians, or Savages, of North America (Observations générales sur les Indiens ou sauvages d'Amérique du Nord), followed by The Ruins and The Natural Law. Éditions CODA. ISBN 9782849670637

== Bibliography ==
=== Main source ===
- Gaulmier, Jean (1959). Volney : un grand témoin de la Révolution et de l'Empire (in French). Hachette.

=== Other sources ===
- François-Yves Besnard, Memoirs of a Nonagenarian (Souvenirs d'un nonagénaire), manuscript edited by Honoré Champion in 1880 under the supervision of Célestin Port.
- Jean-François Bodin devoted a lengthy biographical notice to Volney and published eight previously unpublished letters in Researches on Angers and Lower Anjou (Recherches sur Angers et le bas Anjou), chapters 39 and 40. (Note: Bodin regarded Volney as the greatest literary figure produced by Anjou. Some of his remarks concerning Volney's character gave rise to a controversy with Volney's widow in the Journal des débats. Bodin subsequently retracted his statements and undertook to gather further information (September 1823).)
- Narcisse Henri François Desportes, Bibliography of Maine (Bibliographie du Maine).
- Célestin Port, Dictionary of Maine-et-Loire (Dictionnaire de Maine-et-Loire), vol. II, p. 692; vol. III, p. 749.
- Sainte-Beuve, Monday Chats (Causeries du lundi), vol. VII, pp. 209–344; Revue d'Anjou, vol. VII, pp. 63, 321; 1852, vol. II, p. 95.
- L. Séché, Notice on Volney (Notice sur Volney).
- Jean Sibenaler, He Called Himself Volney: A Biographical Study of Constantin-François Chassebœuf (Il se faisait appeler Volney : approche biographique de Constantin-François Chassebeuf, 1757–1820).

== See also ==
- Les Neuf Sœurs
- Society of the Friends of Truth
- Society of the Friends of the Blacks
- Prix Volney – Wikipedia, in French
- Volney – Wikipedia, in French
- Volney prize

== Notes and references ==
=== Notes ===
Cultural offices
Preceded by Claude-François Lysarde de Radonvilliers	Seat 24; Académie française 1803–1820	Succeeded by Claude-Emmanuel de Pastoret
