= Jean-Claude Delamétherie =

French mineralogist, geologist and paleontologist

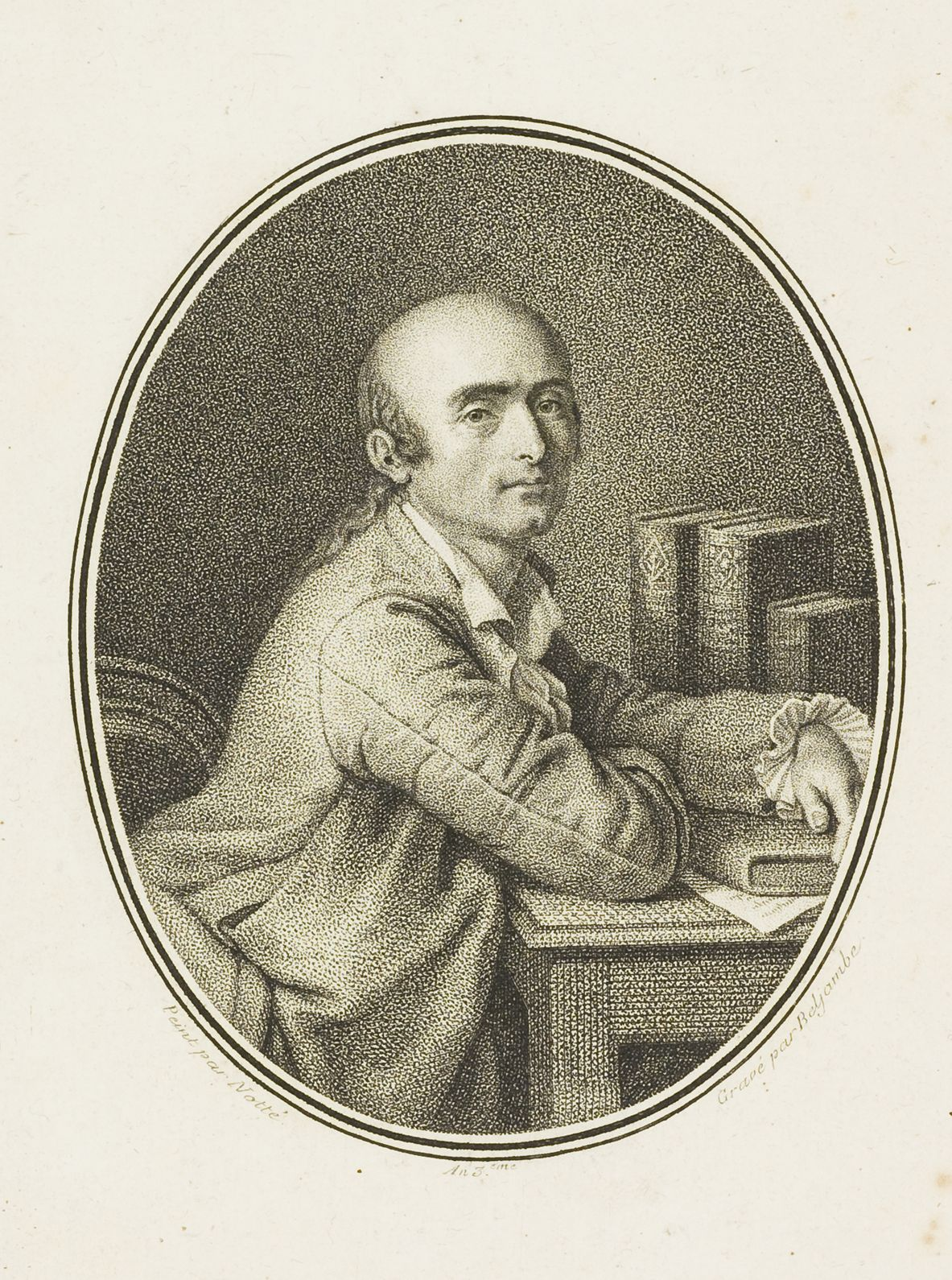
Jean-Claude Delamétherie

Jean-Claude Delamétherie (also de La Métherie, de Lamétherie, 4 September 1743 – 1 July 1817) was a French mineralogist, geologist and paleontologist.

== Career ==
Delamétherie was born in La Clayette. He edited Journal de physique, de chimie, d'histoire naturelle et des arts from 1785. He was elected member of Leopoldina in 1792. He was a supporter of the French Revolution, but opposed to the Jacobins, and was forced to leave Paris during the Reign of Terror, interrupting publication of the Journal de physique until 1797.

Numerous minerals were first systematically described by Delamétherie. In 1795, Delamétherie first described the Lherzolite (which he named after the site of its discovery, Étang de Lers in the Pyrenees).

Delamétherie was an advocate of transmutation of species. He was an atheist and materialist. Delamétherie held similar views to Jean-Baptiste Lamarck but differed on his views on the history of earth. According to science historian Pietro Corsi:

Delamétherie believed in a primeval ocean in which rocks and life were formed through countless ages thanks to processes of crystallization, and maintained that all life forms known to man developed from a restricted number of prototypes equally generated by specific forms of crystallization.

Delamétherie was supportive of the inheritance of acquired characteristics and suspected that Lamarck had copied some of his ideas.

== Publications ==
- Principes de la philosophie naturelle, 1777, 2nd ed. 1787.
- Essai Analytique sur l'Air pur, et les différentes Espèces d'Air, 1785 (online)
- Vues physiologiques sur l’organisation animale et végétale, 1780 (online).
- De la nature des êtres existans, 1805 (online).
- Théorie de la Terre, 1795, 2nd ed. 1797; German translation (1797) Theorie der Erde, 1797 (Bd. 1 online).
- Leçons de minéralogie, 1811.
- Leçons de géologie, 1816.
