= Charles Joseph Mathieu Lambrechts =

Belgian-born French lawyer and minister (1753–1823)

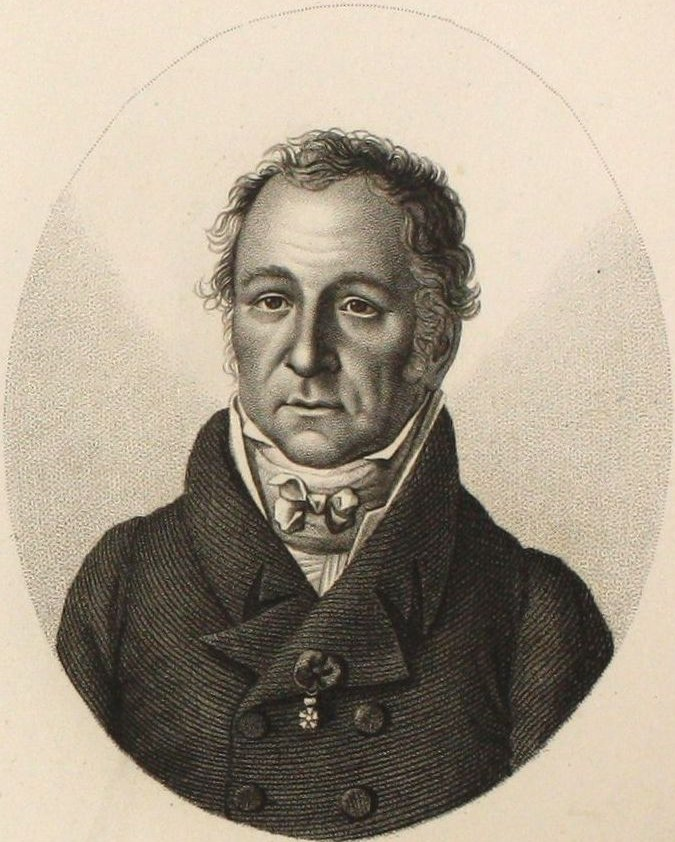

Minister of Justice
- In office 24 September 1797 – 20 July 1799
- Preceded by: Philippe-Antoine Merlin de Douai
- Succeeded by: Jean-Jacques-Régis de Cambacérès

Personal details
- Born: 20 November 1753 Sint-Truiden, Austrian Netherlands
- Died: 4 August 1823 (aged 69) Paris, Kingdom of France
- Occupation: Lawyer; politician

Charles Joseph Mathieu Lambrechts (20 November 1753 – 4 August 1823) was an Austrian Netherlands-born lawyer, rector magnificus of the University of Louvain, who became Minister of Justice of the French Republic, during the Directoire. Later he was a deputy from 1819 to 1824.

== Early years ==
Charles Joseph Mathieu Lambrechts was born in Sint-Truiden, Austrian Netherlands, on 20 November 1753. His father was Gilles de Lambrechts, a colonel in the army of the States General of the Netherlands. He studied civil and canon law at Leuven. He graduated in 1774, became a professor in 1777 and a doctor in 1782. He was elected rector of the university in 1786.

In the year 1778 he was initiated to the Lodge The True and Perfect Harmony of Mons.

In 1788 the Emperor Joseph II charged Lambrechts with visiting the universities of Germany. The goal was for him to study legal education in Germany with the promise that when he returned he would be given the chair of public law and international law in Leuven. The Brabant Revolution (January 1789 – December 1790) upset this plan. Lambrechts sided with the emperor, left Belgium, and only returned after the restoration of imperial authority. In 1793 he established himself in Brussels to practice as an attorney.

== French Revolution ==
Lambrechts declared himself a supporter of the Revolution after the French entered the Austrian Netherlands. He became a municipal officer in Brussels, a member of the central government, then President of the central administration of the Department of Dyle. In 1797, the French Directory appointed him to replace Merlin de Douai at the Ministry of Justice. He held this position from 3 Vendémiaire VI (24 Septembre 1797) to 3 Messidor VIII (22 June 1800). He was a candidate to become a Director when Emmanuel Joseph Sieyès was chosen in place of Jean-François Rewbell. In January 1798 Lambrechts defined the principles that would be followed in the territories occupied by the French armies, writing that servitude was accompanied by ignorance, and freedom could only come when the people were enlightened. They must therefore learn French in school so they could become virtuous citizens.

After the coup of 18 Brumaire VIII (9 November 1799) when the French Consulate came to power Lambrechts was made a member of the Sénat conservateur. He was appointed to the Senate on 3 Nivôse VIII (24 December 1799).

== Empire ==
Lambrechts spoke out against Napoleon Bonaparte's accumulation of power, and was one of three senators who voted against establishment of the empire. Despite this, he was appointed a member of the Legion of Honour on 9 Vendémiaire XII (2 October 1803) and was created Count of the Empire on 13 May 1808. In 1814 Lambrechts was at the head of the minority, and wrote the preamble to the act of deposition of Napoleon. (Note: According to Lafayette, Lambrechts did not write the proposal to depose Napoleon, which was the work of Antoine Destutt de Tracy. He did write the preamble.) He was a member of the commission to prepare a new constitution. However, King Louis XVIII refused to sanction it. Lambrechts refused to give his oath to the emperor during the Hundred Days. He retired to private life during the Hundred Days, and did not return to politics until 1819, after the second Bourbon Restoration.

== Bourbon Restoration ==
On 11 September 1819 Lambrechts was elected to the chamber of deputies for two departments. His health prevented him from appearing except on rare occasions. Lambrechts died on 4 August 1825. He left part of his fortune to various charitable institutions.

== Works ==
Lambrechts' surviving published works include:

- Charles Joseph Mathieu De Lambrechts (1790). Lettre de monsieur de Lambrechts docteur en droit & professeur à l'Université de Louvain. Ecrite au comte de Trauttmansdorff le 20. Septembre 1789. de l'Imprimerie patriotique.
- Rapport sur les peines à infliger dans l'armée navale, et dans les ports et arsenaux fait au nom du Comité de la marine Séance du 16 août 1790
- Le ministre de la justice aux tribunaux civils, criminels et correctionnels, aux commissaires du Directoire exécutif établis près de ces tribunaux.
- Observations d'un citoyen du département des Deux-Nèthes sur les opérations des deux fractions de l'Assemblée électorale du même département 1799|Hacquart
- Charles Joseph Mathieu De Lambrechts (1815). Principes politiques. Paris: Mme Marchant. p. 132.
- Charles-Joseph-Mathieu Lambrechts (1818). Quelques réflexions à l'occasion du livre de M. l'abbé Franssinous, intitulé : "Des vrais principes de l'église Gallicane". Paris: Alexis Eymery.
