= A Defence of the Constitutions of Government of the United States of America =

1787–1788 book by John Adams

A Defense of the Constitutions of Government of the United States of America is a three-volume work by John Adams published in 1787–1788. Adams wrote it while serving as the American ambassador in London.

In Britain, as in previous postings in France and the Netherlands, Adams had confronted several criticisms of the various state constitutions in place at the time. The work is a defense of those documents, not the Constitution of the United States, whose drafting began in May 1787.

The most prominent critic Adams confronted was Anne Robert Jacques Turgot. Turgot's works were read as criticizing the separation of powers found in the state constitutions. Turgot rejected the idea of bicameral legislatures and governors with executive powers, arguing that the best republic was one with a single legislature with all powers and responsibilities. Turgot had died in 1781, but posthumously his ideas had been adopted by other European liberals, including Richard Price and the comte de Mirabeau. Adams believed that Turgot's ideas also had many supporters in the United States.

Turgot argued that the American system was simply a republican gloss over the structures inherited from Britain, a senate replacing the House of Lords and president replacing the king. The bulk of Adam's three-volume book is describing various republics from across history to argue that the American system is designed to take the best parts of all of them. The republics covered include those of Europe in Adams' time, the Netherlands, the city states of northern Italy, and he has discussions of each of the Swiss cantons and their diverse republican systems. He also looks at what he calls the monarchical republics of Britain and Poland, and the classical republics in Greece and Rome.
