= Célestin Port =

French archivist and historian

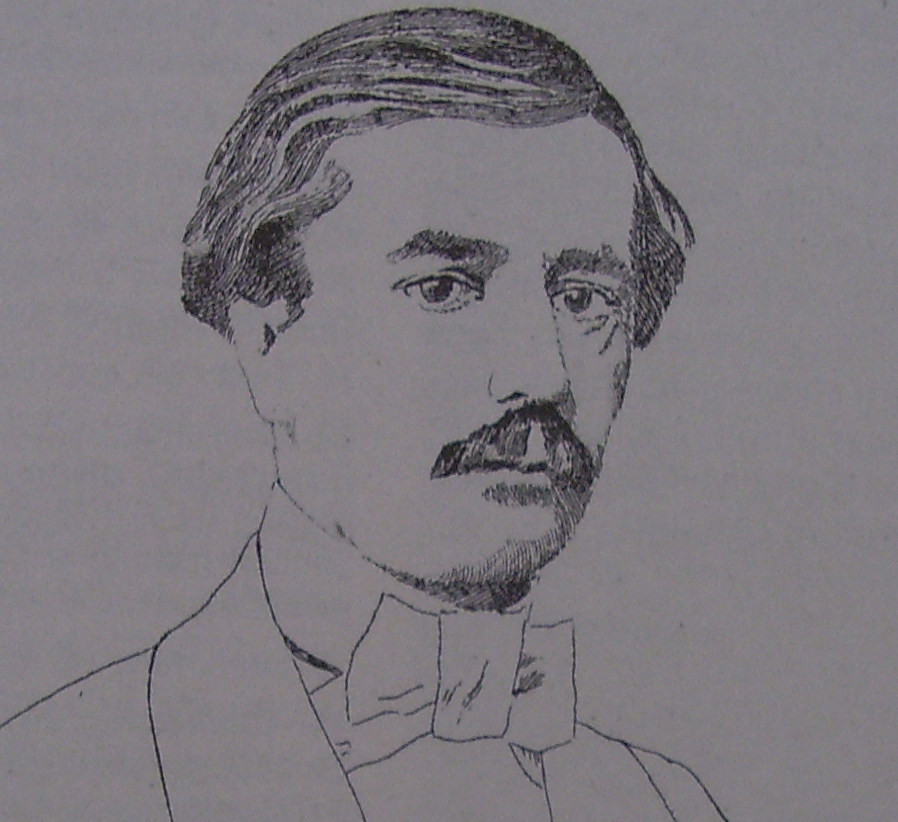
- Portrait of Célestin Port
- Born: 23 May 1828; Paris
- Died: 4 March 1901 (aged 72); Angers
- Education: École Nationale des Chartes
- Known for: History of Anjou
- Scientific career
- Fields: History
- Thesis: Essai sur le commerce maritime de Narbonne (1852)
- Academic advisors: Jules Quicherat

Signature
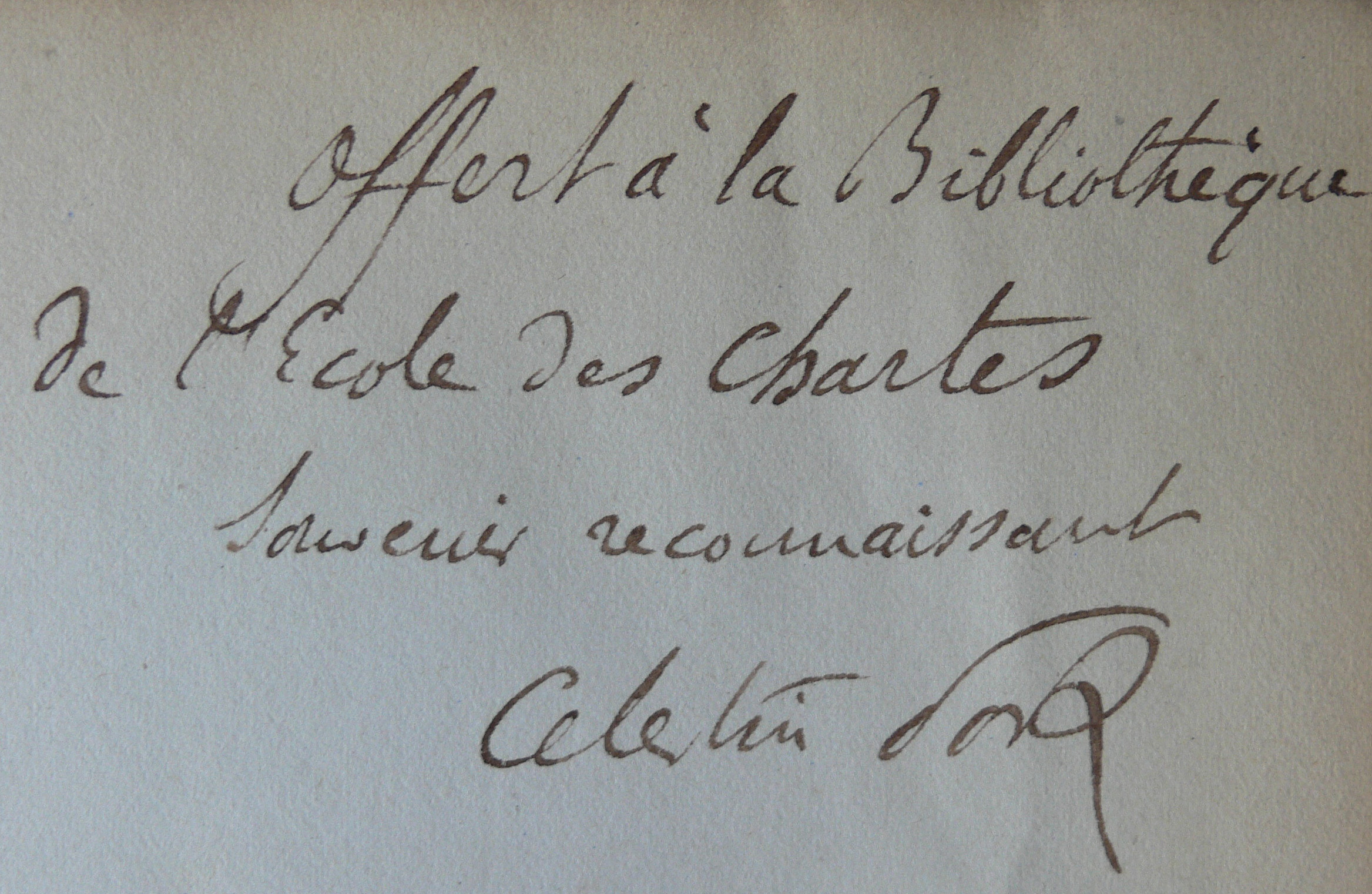

Célestin Port (23 May 1828 – 4 March 1901) was a French archivist and historian.

== Early life and education ==
Born in Paris to a modest family (his father ran an umbrella shop), he studied at the École des chartes, composed a thesis entitled Essai sur le commerce maritime de Narbonne [Essay on the maritime commerce of Narbonne] (submitted in 1852) and, in 1854, became archivist of the Department of Maine-et-Loire.

== Career ==
Spurred on by his teacher Jules Quicherat, he dedicated forty-seven years of his life to the history of Anjou, on which he published several important works. His masterpiece — often plagiarised — is his "Dictionnaire historique, géographique et biographique de Maine-et-Loire" published in three volumes from 1874 to 1878. He also studied the War in the Vendée.

He worked at the same time on the classification of the departmental archives and, in 1891, he donated his personal collection of archival material to the departmental archives.

== Other interests ==
Célestin Port made no mystery of his militant republican sympathies, but he kept his distance from party politics. His other interests included the theatre and Latin poetry. He also amassed a collection of engravings and photographs.

== Publications ==
- Port, Célestin (1874–1878). Dictionnaire historique géographique et biographique de Maine-et-Loire [Historical, Geographic and Biographic Dictionary of Maine-et-Loire] (in French). Paris: J.-B. Dumoulin. 3 volumes, also published by Lachèse et Dolbeau, Angers.
- Port, Célestin (1877). L'inventaire et le chartrier de l'Hôpital Saint-Jean d'Angers : lettre à M. P. Marchegay, des Roches-Baritaud (in French). Angers: Impr-Libr E Barassé. 40 pp
- Port, Célestin (1861). Inventaire analytique des archives anciennes de la mairie d'Angers suivi de tables et de documents inédits : publié sous les auspices du conseil municipal par M. Célestin Port [Analytical inventory of the ancient archives of the town hall of Angers followed by tables and unpublished documents: published under the auspices of the municipal council by M. Célestin Port] (in French). Paris: J. Dumoulin. 628pp. Also published by Cosnier et Lachèse (Angers)

== Bibliography ==
- Verry, Élisabeth (1992). "Célestin Port, un homme de convictions (1828-1901)" [Célestin Port, a man of convictions (1828-1901)]. Annales de Bretagne et des Pays de l'Ouest. 4 (in French). 99. doi:10.3406/abpo.1992.3458. OCLC 491744355. (Reprinted from journal edition originally themed: "Républiques & républicains d'Anjou")
