= Idéologues =

Group of French philosophers, physicians and economists

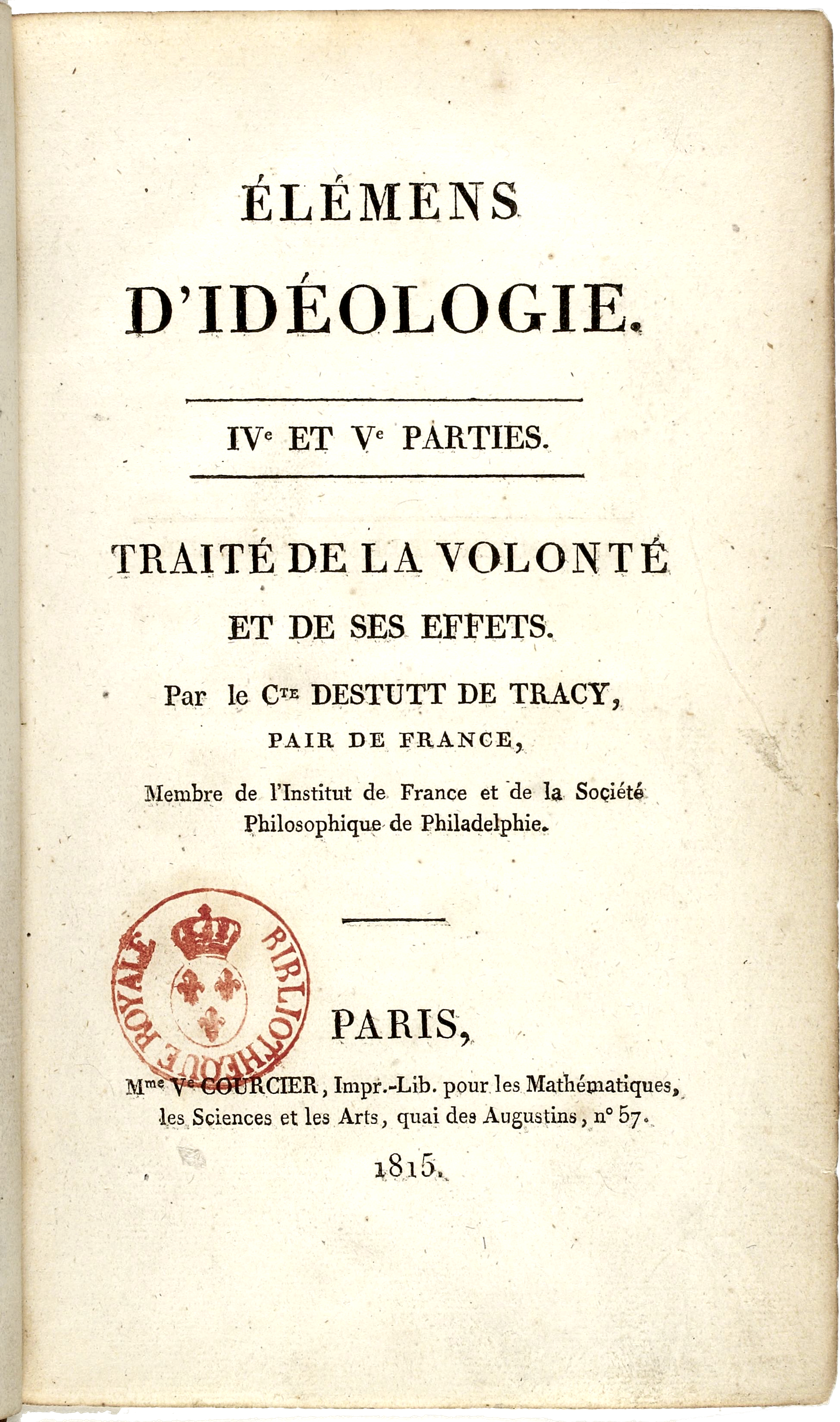
Frontispiece of Destutt de Tracy's Éléments d'idéologie, Parts IV and V: Traité de la volonté et de ses effets, 1815

The idéologues were a group of French philosophers, physicians and economists, active from the mid-1790s until the end of the Napoleonic era. With the philosopher Antoine Destutt de Tracy and the physician Pierre-Jean-Georges Cabanis as their leading theorists, the group aimed to develop a systematic "science of ideas" (idéologie) grounded in eighteenth-century sensualist epistemology and focused on moral, political and educational reform. Although they were never a formal academy, the idéologues nonetheless influenced France's educational system and intellectual life during the Directory through the Institut de France, the journal La Décade philosophique and salons such as that of Madame Helvétius.

The relationship between the idéologues and Napoleon Bonaparte was complex and conflictual. Prominent idéologues had supported Napoleon's 1799 coup, but they later criticised his accumulation of power, and defended a secular, anti-clerical understanding of religion. Napoleon, who had concentrated executive authority in the office of First Consul and negotiated the Concordat of 1801 with Pope Pius VII, denounced the idéologues as "metaphysicians" detached from practical governance, employed the term idéologue as an insult and even accused them of subversive intentions. His hostility culminated in 1803 with the suppression of the Class of Moral and Political Sciences at the Institut de France, largely dominated by the idéologues.

Despite their decline under Napoleon, the idéologues continued to be influential. Their work became a lasting intellectual passion for the writer Stendhal and was admired and supported by the statesman Thomas Jefferson. Their emphasis on the scientific study of ideas contributed to early nineteenth-century liberal thought and to the emergence of the social sciences. The term "ideology" was later taken up and transformed by other thinkers, most notably Karl Marx, who used it to denote systems of ideas that obscure social reality, in a critical sense quite different from that intended by Destutt de Tracy.

== Etymology and changing meaning ==
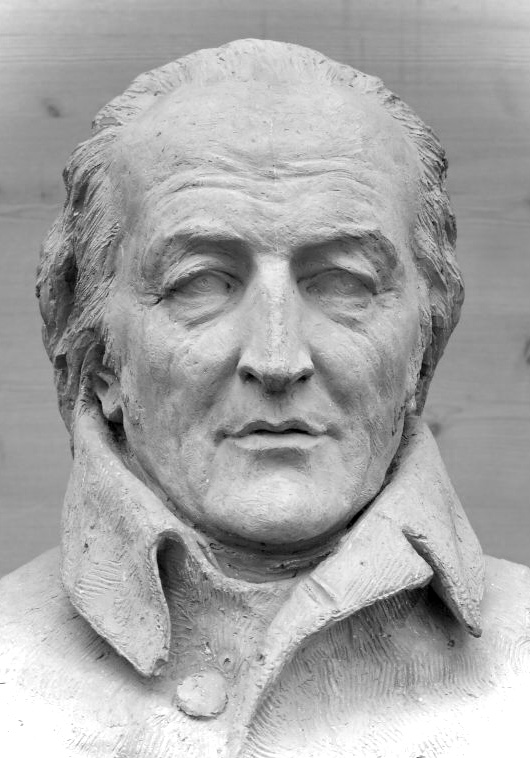
Bust of Destutt de Tracy by David d'Angers

Antoine Destutt de Tracy coined the term idéologie in 1796 to designate a new "science of ideas" grounded in the analysis of sensations and mental operations (memory, judgement and will) and intended to replace metaphysical speculation with a disciplined study of ideas and language. Destutt de Tracy explained that the neologism was necessary because "psychology", as it was understood at the time, implied an unwarranted metaphysical claim to knowledge of the soul. He proposed idéologie as an alternative to speculative metaphysics: a rigorous discipline grounded in physiological and psychological observation, which he conceived as belonging to the domain of physiology or zoology. As a foundational and comprehensive science, idéologie was intended to unify the moral and political sciences and to provide a basis for grammar, logic, education, morality and political organisation, thereby guiding legislation and social reform.

As used by Destutt de Tracy and his circle, the term idéologie had a descriptive and methodological meaning. Subsequent usage, however – particularly in political rhetoric, such as Napoleon's polemical references to the idéologues – deviated sharply from its original meaning. The term idéologue first appeared as a derogatory label in the royalist press in 1800, targeting former supporters of the Directory who had shifted their allegiance to endorse Napoleon's coup. According to historian Bo Stråth, the term ideology became "ideologized and politicized". Whereas Destutt de Tracy conceived idéologie as a rigorous science that would liberate moral and political knowledge from centuries of prejudice, Karl Marx used "ideology" to designate systems of ideas that obscure social reality and legitimise existing relations of domination and exploitation. Marx and Marxists understood ideology as a system of beliefs rather than a science, and as a form of "false consciousness" rather than a method for eliminating error. Destutt de Tracy himself was dismissed by Marx as a "fish-blooded bourgeois doctrinaire" in Capital.

As the term ideology came to denote belief systems instead of a science of ideas, the noun idéologue likewise shifted in meaning. Today in English, the word is commonly used as a synonym of "ideologist" to denote a person strongly guided by a set of ideas or principles, often implying rigid commitment, strong partisanship or impractical idealism.

== Historical and institutional context ==
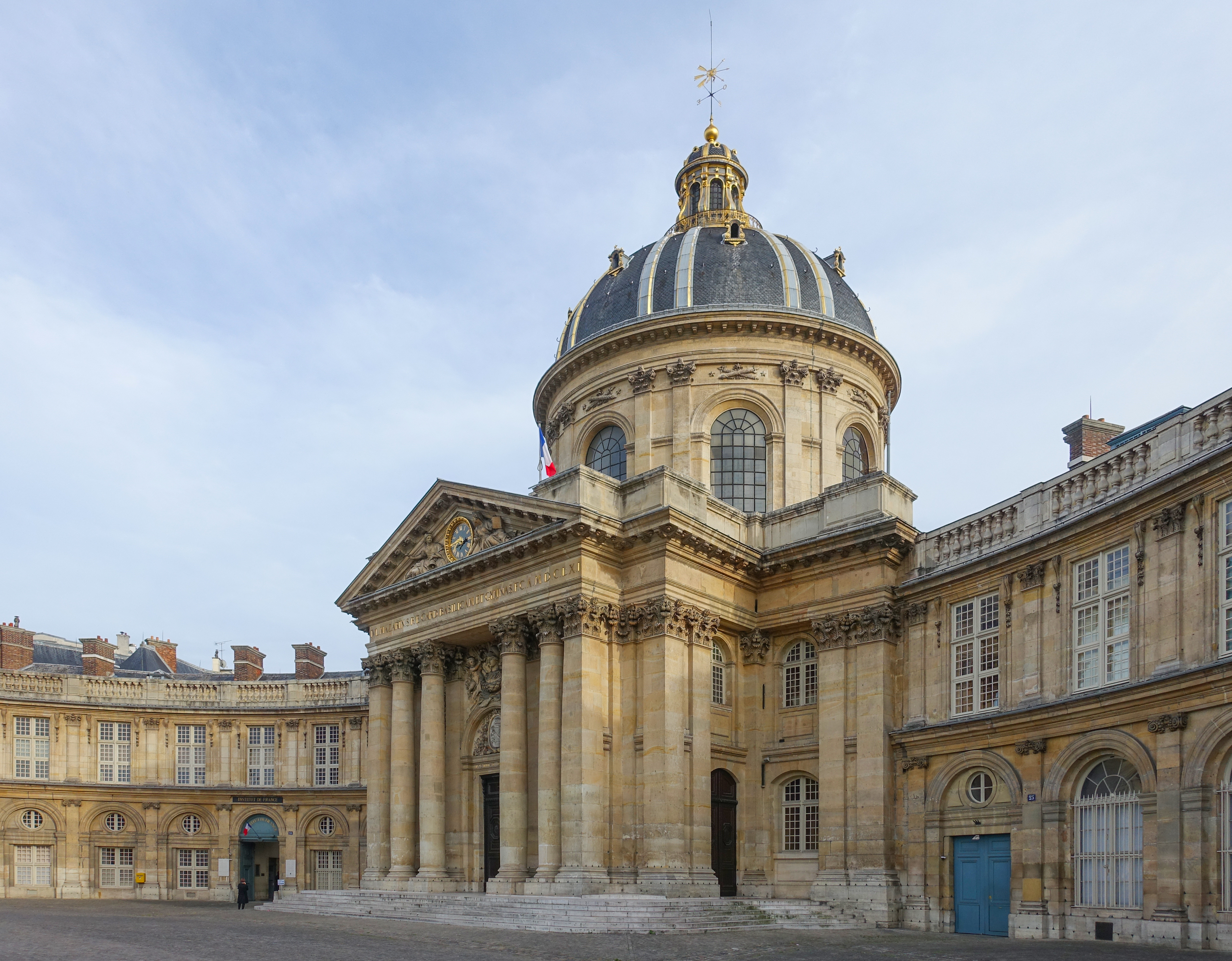
Collège des Quatre-Nations, since 1805 the seat of the Institut de France

The idéologues belonged to a late-Enlightenment generation whose intellectual formation predated the French Revolution and whose public careers were shaped by its upheavals. Several figures later associated with the group were imprisoned during the Reign of Terror, and many viewed Robespierre and the politics of the Jacobins as hostile to Enlightenment values, incompatible with constitutional government and conducive to civil disorder. Following Thermidor, leading figures such as Destutt de Tracy distanced themselves from Jacobinism, which he later described as the work of "men half fanatical, half hypocritical", and turned to philosophy and education, which they saw as remedies for revolutionary violence.

The activity of the group flourished in the political and institutional context that followed Thermidor. The suppression of the royal academies and the reorganisation of cultural and scientific institutions opened new opportunities for their involvement in education, politics and public administration. Some of these opportunities were created by the Abbé Sieyès, a leading revolutionary theorist and member of the Directory's governing elite. Although Sieyès' membership among the idéologues is disputed, he acted as the circle's "elder patron" and, through his sponsorship and endorsement of candidates to the Institut national, was an important facilitator of the group's institutional position under the Directory. Their institutional reach also extended to revolutionary educational experiments such as the École normale de l'an III, where Dominique Joseph Garat taught Locke and Condillac.

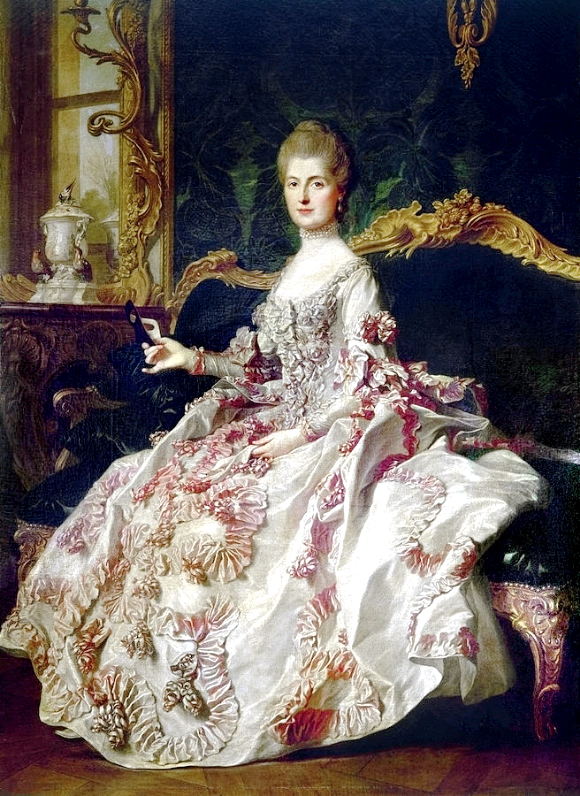
Madame Helvétius, at whose salon in Auteuil the idéologues gathered

Thus, idéologie briefly acquired the status of a quasi-official philosophy of the Republic during the Directory. It was promoted through newly established institutions, most notably the Classe des sciences morales et politiques of the Institut de France, founded in 1795 and later reconstituted as the Académie des Sciences Morales et Politiques. Approximately eleven figures associated with the idéologues served as members or close associates of the Institut, several within the section devoted to the "analysis of sensations and ideas". Between 1798 and 1800, members of the idéologues were also prominently represented on the Conseil de l'instruction publique (Council of Public Instruction), where they played a significant role in the organisation, curriculum and pedagogical orientation of the newly established écoles centrales. Among them, Constantin François de Chassebœuf, comte de Volney, later served as director of Napoleon's Bureau de statistique.

The group brought together individuals from diverse intellectual and professional backgrounds. Pierre-Jean-Georges Cabanis was a physician; Volney a traveller, geographer, orientalist and historian; Destutt de Tracy a philosopher as well as a political theorist and economist; Pierre Daunou an archivist and historian; and Jean-Baptiste Say, initially a journalist, later an entrepreneur and finally an economist. Under the Consulate, several figures associated with the idéologues sat in the Sénat conservateur, including Destutt de Tracy, Cabanis, Volney and Garat, while others served in the Tribunat, notably Daunou, Chénier and Ginguené.

The idéologues disseminated their republican, secular and reformist views through the journal La Décade philosophique, littéraire et politique and through Parisian salons, most notably that of Madame Helvétius in Auteuil – the "stronghold" of the group – as well as those of Sophie de Condorcet and the Princesse de Salm. These salons brought together philosophers, administrators, educators and writers, thereby increasing the group's visibility in post-Thermidorian intellectual life.

== Philosophy ==
The idéologues drew on the sensualism of Étienne Bonnot de Condillac, adopting his "analysis of sensations and ideas" as their explicit philosophical programme, and on the utilitarian ethics of Claude-Adrien Helvétius. From Condillac they derived that all knowledge originates in sensation and that complex mental operations can be explained through analysis, understood as the decomposition of ideas into simpler elements grounded in sense-experience, without recourse to metaphysical faculties or innate ideas. From Helvétius they derived a naturalistic and interest-based conception of morality: vices and virtues are grounded in the pursuit of utility and can be shaped through education and rational legislation. They also regarded themselves as heirs to the reformist ambitions of other eighteenth-century philosophes, particularly Condorcet, whom they described as their "master and guide".

Their philosophy took the form of a science de l'homme intended to overcome traditional metaphysics by integrating the analysis of ideas with physiology. Destutt de Tracy revised the sensualism tradition by assigning an active role to sensation in the genesis of thought and volition and by emphasising the dependence of mental phenomena on bodily processes. Together with Cabanis, he rejected the dualism of soul and body in favour of a unitary conception of the human being as both a natural and a moral entity. According to anthropologist Sergio Moravia, this shift marked a transition from a psychology of ideas to an early form of anthropology, in which the object of philosophy is no longer the isolated idea but the human being considered in the totality of cognitive, affective and practical functions.

According to Destutt de Tracy, sensory perceptions are, in themselves, free of error; he located the source of error not in perception but in the will, which introduces distortion by encouraging individuals to privilege agreeable beliefs and to disregard unwelcome evidence. Idéologie was therefore intended as a corrective practice: by analysing sentiments and preferences, it could help distinguish those dispositions conducive to sound judgment from those that generate a distorted or false form of consciousness. Rights and duties, including property, were derived from the faculty of the will, and liberty was conceived as the power to act according to one's desires and thus as the basis of happiness; the aim of society was to expand individual liberty while preventing mutual harm.

In moral and political theory, the idéologues defended a naturalistic conception of morality, emphasised the role of education in forming enlightened and engaged citizens, and argued for rational legislation grounded in an analysis of human faculties. Destutt de Tracy rejected both Hobbesian pessimism and naïve optimism about natural sociability, conceiving society as a system of exchanges arising from cooperation and capable of progress. While he recognised natural inequalities and instincts of domination, he denied that these justified social hierarchy and instead understood moral norms and political institutions as corrective mechanisms, above all to limit inequalities of power. Idéologie was an attempt to provide a rational and empirical foundation for ethics, political economy and legislation through a comprehensive science of human nature; it was conceived as a practical and politically engaged science, both "positive" (non-speculative) and socially useful, oriented toward the regulation and reform of society.

Politically, the idéologues defended what historian Emmet Kennedy characterises as a "conservative post-Thermidorian liberalism of a part of the propertied class". They supported property rights and free trade, and stressed the productivity of artisans and entrepreneurs, positions that contributed to the development of early French liberal political economy. In this regard, Jean-Baptiste Say played a significant role, and his political economy lectures have been described as an "indisputably successful legacy" of the idéologues.

They also defended free thought, free press and individual liberties, and had a secular view of society and the state. They argued that organised religion was merely an instrument of clerical power and could not form the basis for organising post-revolutionary French society. Even deism, with its appeal to a moral God, retained metaphysical assumptions that Destutt de Tracy and other idéologues regarded as unnecessary for grounding morals and politics. Religion, they maintained, should remain a personal matter and the state should be strictly neutral in religious affairs. These positions, which have been described as forerunners of the doctrine of laïcité, attracted criticism from Catholic writers such as Louis de Fontanes and François-René de Chateaubriand, who attacked the idéologues' materialism and hostility to religion. Ultimately, these positions were one of the factors that led to conflict between the idéologues and Napoleon.

== Relationship with Napoleon ==
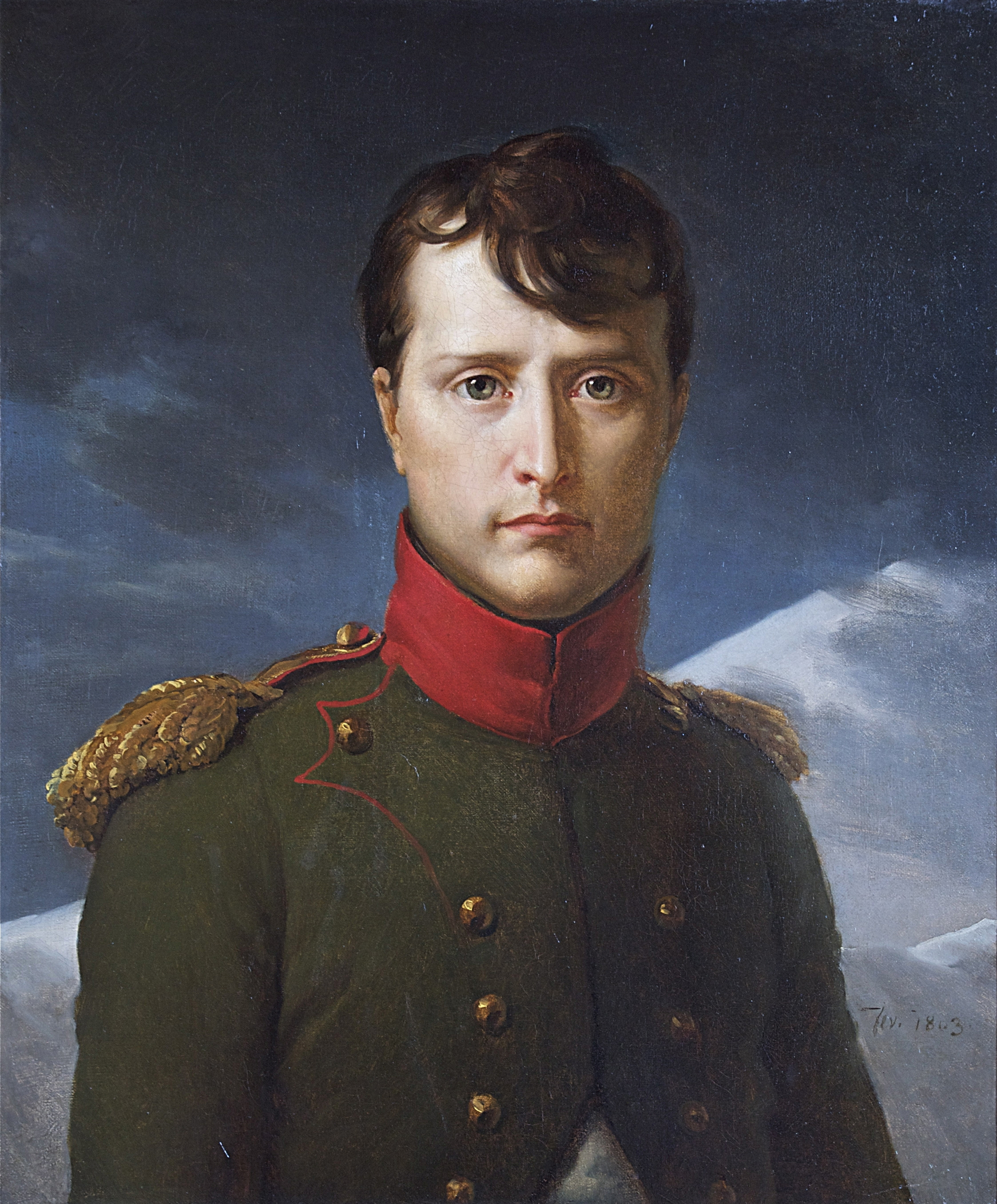
Portrait of Napoleon Bonaparte, First Consul, 1803, by François Gérard

In 1799, many idéologues supported the overthrow of the Directory in the coup of 18 Brumaire, hailing Napoleon as a guarantor of constitutional order and civil peace, and hoping that a strong executive would restore political stability and repress Jacobinism. Several of them, including Destutt de Tracy, Cabanis and Volney, participated in the early institutions of the consulate. Jean-Baptiste Say welcomed the Constitution of the Year VIII, writing that "the ignorant class no longer exerts any influence either over the legislature or over the government (...) Everything is done for the people and in its name; nothing is done by it, nor under its unreflective dictation".

However, the relations between the group and the First Consul deteriorated rapidly after 1800. The idéologues grew distrustful of Napoleon's religious and educational policy and of his repression of civil and political liberty. Napoleon became increasingly suspicious of their republicanism and liberal, secular orientation, and ultimately moved to curtail their political and institutional influence. He denounced them as "metaphysicians" detached from practical governance, "windbags", "whimsical dreamers divorced from reality". Celebrating Christianity as a means of pacification and social control, Napoleon complained about the idéologues destroying "all illusions", as "the age of illusions is for individuals as for peoples the age of happiness". He reproached them for having "adulated the people and attributed to it a sovereignty which it was incapable of exercising", at times even accusing them of engaging in subversive plans and conspiracies.

Hostility was accompanied by direct political action. In January 1802, the year of the Concordat with Pope Pius VII, Napoleon purged the Tribunate of members associated with the idéologues and abolished the écoles centrales in favour of lycées whose new curricula excluded the study of ideology, general grammar and legislation. In January 1803, he suppressed the Class of Moral and Political Sciences at the Institut de France, the group's primary institutional base. Its dissolution effectively dismantled their collective influence and marked a decisive break between the idéologues and the consulate. Many were relegated to less sensitive fields within the Institut and turned to writing rather than public administration or educational reform. In 1807, the increasingly compliant Décade philosophique was forcibly merged with the conservative Mercure de France, at the government's behest. The term idéologie began to lose its original philosophical meaning, becoming instead associated with abstract and impractical speculation.

== Influence and legacy ==
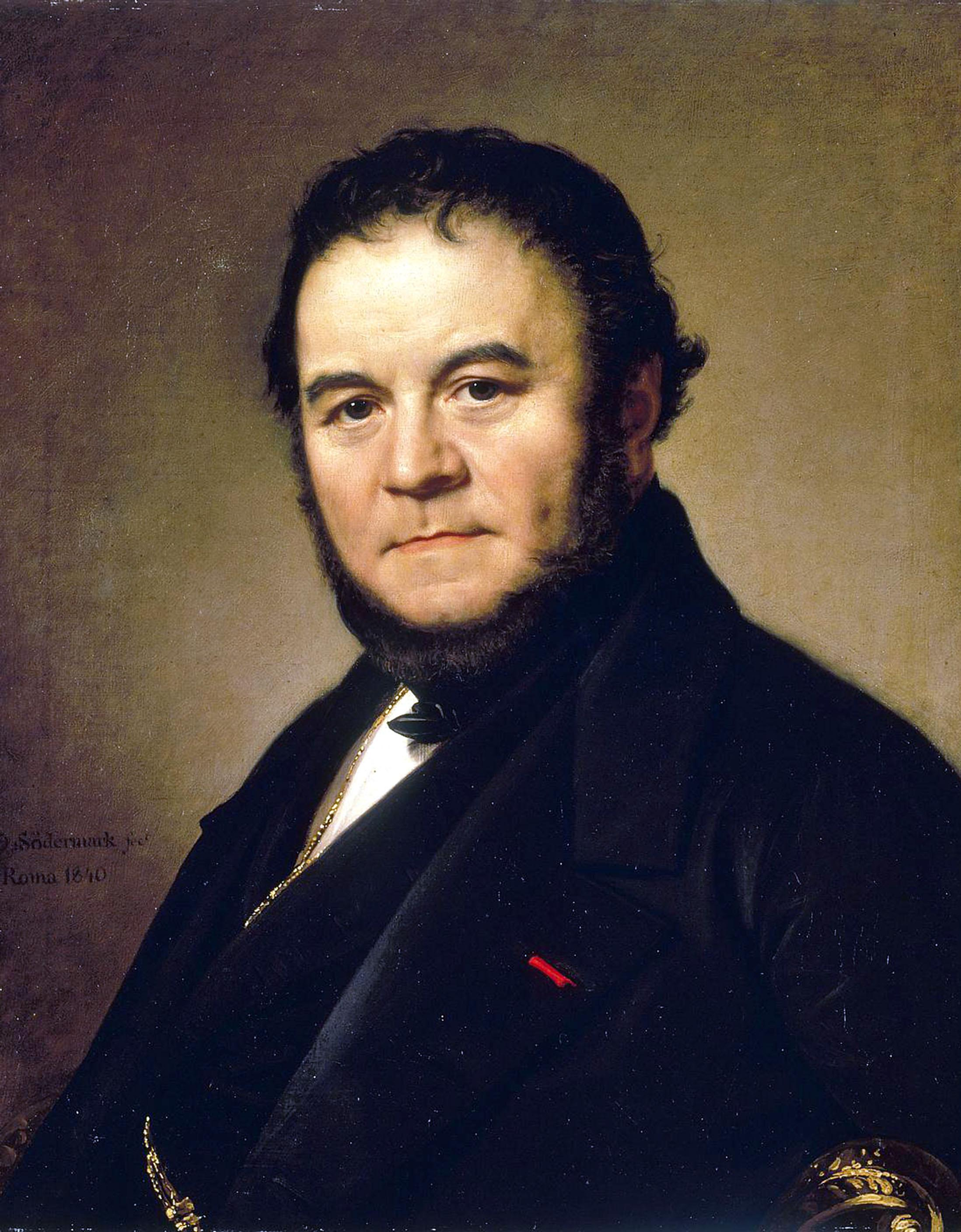
Stendhal in 1840, portrait by Olof Johan Södermark

Despite their political marginalisation under the Consulate and Empire, the idéologues contributed to the development of the social sciences in the nineteenth century through their ambition to place the government of society on a scientifically grounded basis. Although their programme for a unified "science of ideas" did not survive, this ambition was taken up by emerging disciplines. Scholars therefore identify the idéologues as significant figures in the transition from Enlightenment philosophy to early nineteenth-century political economy, psychology, linguistics and anthropology.

The social theorist and early socialist Saint-Simon revived the idéologues' aim of "regenerating" society through the reorganisation of knowledge, but he presented his "new encyclopaedia" as an instrument of imperial policy and grounded it in a unifying doctrine (physicisme) meant to secure social cohesion, in contrast to the idéologues' secular, anti-metaphysical outlook.

Likewise, Auguste Comte inherited the idéologues' ambition to found a positive science of society, but rejected their focus on psychology and sensations by reframing the new discipline as "sociology" instead of "ideology". In his view, social phenomena must be analysed at the level of the social whole and its governing laws, rather than reduced to individual minds or psychological faculties. For this reason, the idéologues have been described as a transitional generation, situated between Enlightenment philosophy and nineteenth-century positivism.

The influence of the idéologues also extended into literature. The French writer Stendhal described ideology as "the only durable thing" that had transformed his thinking, referred to Destutt de Tracy's political commentary on Montesquieu as his credo politique, and in De l'amour, he described his analysis of love as grounded in the analytical approach of idéologie.

Outside France, idéologie was largely rejected in Germany, while its influence was strongest in Italy and Spain, where their ideas were even used by national intellectual movements. In Italy, philosopher and educator Francesco Soave is identified as an exponent of this movement, although he reproached Destutt de Tracy for radicalising Condillac's sensualism to the point of materialism and Epicureanism.

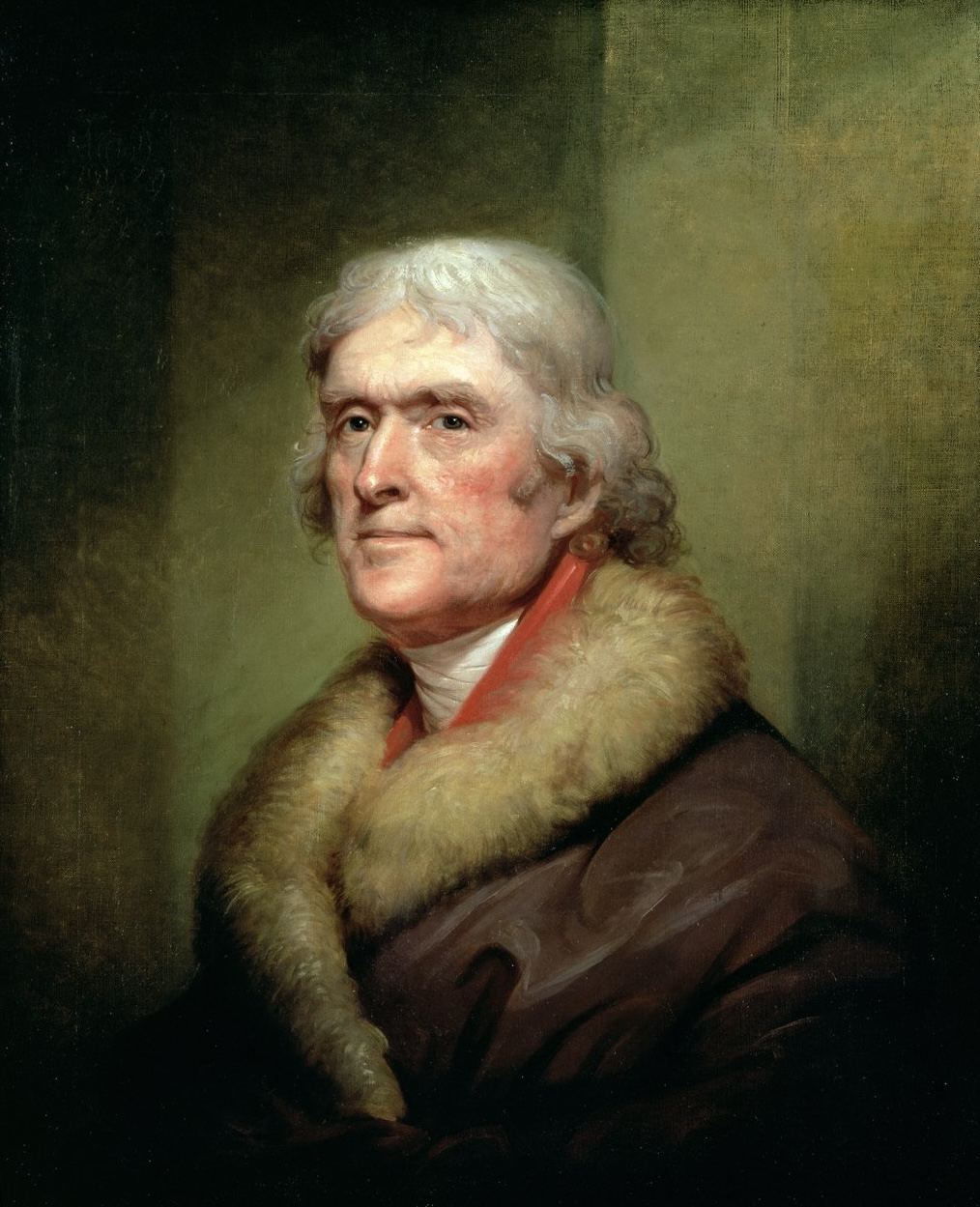
Thomas Jefferson corresponded closely with Destutt de Tracy and actively promoted his political and economic writings in the United States

During his Paris stay from 1805, the young poet and writer Alessandro Manzoni came into contact with the idéologues through his close friendship with Claude Fauriel, encounters with Cabanis and Destutt de Tracy, and intellectual circles associated with Sophie de Condorcet. The significance of this contact has been debated: while Manzoni later rejected the sensualist and materialist premises of idéologie, scholars have noted that he absorbed, largely through Fauriel and Cabanis, certain methodological traits, such as analytic rigor and the search for a unifying cause, without adopting their doctrines as a whole.

In the United States, the work of the idéologues found an audience among liberal republican thinkers. Primarily interested in Destutt de Tracy's political and economic theories rather than in idéologie as a theory of ideas, former President Thomas Jefferson regarded Destutt de Tracy's commentary on Montesquieu as a means of countering conservative interpretations influential in Atlantic political debate. Acting on this conviction, he corresponded with Destutt de Tracy, closely oversaw the translation and 1811 publication of his Commentary on Montesquieu's Spirit of the Laws, and took personal responsibility for reviewing the manuscript and drafting a prefatory letter that concealed the author's identity. In the years that followed, Jefferson devoted several months to correcting the English translation of Destutt de Tracy's Traité de la volonté, published in 1817 as Political Economy, working up to five hours a day on the task. Through Jefferson's influence, Destutt de Tracy was elected a member of the American Philosophical Society.

In Les mots et les choses, philosopher Michel Foucault calls idéologie "the last of the Classical philosophies" because, by extending its reflection across the whole field of knowledge, it seeks to reabsorb into representation what is being formed outside it; yet its ambition to construct "the great table of all that is representable" is undermined by the epistemic shift Foucault locates around 1795–1800, when representation loses the power to found the relations that organise knowledge.

== Membership ==
Since the group had no formal membership, historians have identified participants on the basis of shared philosophical and political commitments, collaboration in key institutions and overlapping salon networks. Historian Martin S. Staum defines the idéologues as "authors of a major work in medical or philosophical Ideology or in elements of ethics, politics, economics, and having at least two of the following attributes: (1) attendance at the salons of Mme Helvétius, Destutt de Tracy, or Mme de Condorcet in the period 1794-1809; (2) on the staff of or a contributor to La Décade philosophique; (3) and moderate republican after 1794 and in opposition to Bonaparte after 1801". Based on these criteria, he identifies as idéologues Volney, Garat, Ginguené, Cabanis, Destutt de Tracy, Laromiguière, Degérando, Roussel, Daunou, Sieyès, Roederer.

=== Intellectual precursors and programmatic architects ===
- Marie-Jean-Antoine Nicolas de Caritat, marquis de Condorcet — master figure and intellectual guide of the idéologues.
- Emmanuel-Joseph Sieyès — politically and intellectually connected to the idéologues, frequently attacked by Napoleon alongside them; "elder patron" whose status as an idéologue is disputed.

=== Central figures ===
- Antoine Louis Claude Destutt, comte de Tracy — founder of idéologie and principal theorist of the "science of ideas".
- Pierre Jean Georges Cabanis — physician, Destutt de Tracy's closest collaborator and a key figure in ideological physiology and moral science.
- Constantin François de Chassebœuf, comte de Volney — historian, orientalist, and political theorist.
- Pierre Claude François Daunou — historian, archivist, constitutional theorist and politician.
- Dominique-Joseph Garat — publicist and politician.

=== Other idéologues ===
- François-Stanislas Andrieux — writer and dramatist.
- Marie-Joseph Chénier — poet, dramatist and politician.
- Joseph-Marie Degérando, baron de Gérando — philosopher of ideas and signs, representative of "pure" ideology.
- Pierre Samuel Du Pont de Nemours — physiocratic economist and politician.
- Pierre-Louis Ginguené — publicist, writer, literary historian, commissioner of public instruction.
- Pierre Laromiguière — philosopher exponent of a moderated sensualism.
- Jacques-Louis Moreau de la Sarthe — physician and medical writer.
- Philippe Pinel — physician, precursor of psychiatry, zoologist.
- Pierre Roussel — physician.
- Pierre Louis Roederer — politician, economist, and historian, a defender of private property and free trade.
- Jean-Baptiste Say — economist; key idéologue in political economy and contributor to the group's enduring influence.

== See also ==
- Ideology
- Sensualism
- Coppet group
- Institut de France
- Étienne Bonnot de Condillac
- History of the social sciences

== Bibliography ==
- Bacot, Guillaume (2003). "Les Idéologues et le groupe de Coppet". Revue Française d'Histoire des Idées Politiques (in French) (18). L'Harmattan: 227–231. doi:10.3917/rfhip.018.0227. ISSN 1266-7862. JSTOR 24610202.
- Baker, K.M. (1964). "The early history of the term 'social science'". Annals of Science. 20 (3): 211–226. doi:10.1080/00033796400203074. ISSN 0003-3790.
- Deneys, Henry (1994). Deneys, Henri; Deneys-Tunney, Anne (eds.). "Le crépuscule de l'idéologie : sur le destin de la philosophie "idéologiste" de Destutt de Tracy". Corpus. Revue de philosophie (in French) (26). Centre national de la recherche scientifique (CNRS): 99–132.
- Deneys, Henri; Deneys-Tunney, Anne, eds. (1994). "Destutt de Tracy et l'Idéologie". Corpus. Revue de philosophie (in French) (26). Centre national de la recherche scientifique (CNRS).
- Devarieux, Anne (18 July 2024). "Maine de Biran and the Legacy of Ideology". The Oxford Handbook of Modern French Philosophy. Oxford University Press. pp. 27–42. doi:10.1093/oxfordhb/9780198841869.013.1. ISBN 978-0-19-884186-9.
- Fiore, Vincenzo (2014). "Manzoni, Fauriel e la rinascita europea dell'idillio" (PDF). Nasleđe (in Italian). 29. Faculty of Philology and Arts, University of Kragujevac: 145–159.
- Floriani, Piero (2007). "Manzoni, Alessandro". Dizionario Biografico degli Italiani (in Italian). Vol. 69. Istituto dell'Enciclopedia Italiana.
- Foucault, Michel (2001) [1966]. Order of Things. London: Routledge. ISBN 0-203-99664-X.
- Haßler, Gerda (May 1998). "Review of Roland Bernecker, Die "idéologie" in Italien. Eine kommentierte Bibliographie zur Sprachtheorie der Spätaufklärung". The Henry Sweet Society for the History of Linguistic Ideas Bulletin (30). London: 21–23. doi:10.1080/02674971.1998.11745476. ISSN 0267-4971.
- Head, Brian (1984). "The Ideologues Revisited: Ideology, Science and Perfectibility". Canadian Journal of Political and Social Theory / Revue canadienne de théorie politique et sociale. 8 (1–2): 163–178.
- Jamin, Jean (1982). "Le syndrome chinois des Idéologues ou les débuts de la sociolinguistique". Histoire Épistémologie Langage (in French). 4 (1): 83–92. doi:10.3406/hel.1982.1088. ISSN 0750-8069.
- Jennings, Jeremy (2011). "Introduction". In Destutt de Tracy, Antoine Louis Claude (ed.). A Treatise on Political Economy. Indianapolis: Liberty Fund. pp. ix–xix. ISBN 978-0-86597-812-6.
- Kennedy, Emmet (1979). ""Ideology" from Destutt de Tracy to Marx". Journal of the History of Ideas. 40 (3): 353–368. doi:10.2307/2709242. JSTOR 2709242.
- Kennedy, Emmet (1994). Deneys, Henri; Deneys-Tunney, Anne (eds.). "Aux origines de l' "Idéologie"". Corpus. Revue de philosophie (in French) (26). Centre national de la recherche scientifique (CNRS): 11–32.
- Kennedy, Emmet (2001). "The secularism of Destutt de Tracy's 'Ideology'" (PDF). Freie Universität Berlin.
- Lalevée, Thomas (2020). "L'encyclopédisme de Saint-Simon : de l'Idéologie au socialisme". In Bourdeau, Vincent; Chappey, Jean-Luc; Vincent, Julien (eds.). Les encyclopédismes en France à l'ère des révolutions (1789–1850) (in French). Presses universitaires de Franche-Comté. pp. 103–106. doi:10.4000/books.pufc.18719. ISBN 978-2-84867-839-9.
- Lok, Matthijs (3 July 2024). "Religion and the post-revolutionary mind: idéologues, Catholic traditionalists, and liberals in France: by Arthur McCalla, Montreal, CA, McGill-Queen's University Press, 2023, 464 pp., CAD $130.00, hardcover, ISBN: 9780228016588". History of European Ideas. 50 (5): 911–913. doi:10.1080/01916599.2024.2315256. ISSN 0191-6599.
- McCalla, Arthur (2023). Religion and the post-revolutionary mind: idéologues, Catholic traditionalists, and liberals in France. Montreal & Kingston, London, Chicago: McGill-Queen's University Press. ISBN 978-0-2280-1658-8.
- Micheli, Giuseppe (2018). "SOAVE, Francesco". Dizionario Biografico degli Italiani. Vol. 93. Roma: Istituto della Enciclopedia Italiana.
- Moravia, Sergio (1966). "Aspetti della "science de l'homme" nella filosofia degli "Idéologues": I. Filosofia e fisiologia in Destutt de Tracy e in Cabanis". Rivista Critica di Storia della Filosofia (in Italian). 21 (4): 398–425. JSTOR 44021720.
- Moravia, Sergio (1967). "Aspetti della "science de l'homme" nella filosofia degli "Idéologues": II. Società e morale in Destutt de Tracy". Rivista Critica di Storia della Filosofia (in Italian). 22 (1): 54–86. JSTOR 44019975.
- Moravia, Sergio (1973). "GLI « IDÉOLOGUES » E L'ETÀ DEI LUMI". Belfagor (in Italian). 28 (3). Casa Editrice Leo S. Olschki s.r.l.: 253–265. ISSN 0005-8351. JSTOR 26142539.
- Nicolet, Claude (1996). "L'Institut des « idéologues »". Mélanges de l'École française de Rome: Italie et Méditerranée (in French). 108 (2): 659–676. doi:10.3406/mefr.1996.4462.
- Paret, Peter (1993). "Jefferson and the Birth of European Liberalism". Proceedings of the American Philosophical Society. 137 (4). American Philosophical Society: 488–497. ISSN 0003-049X. JSTOR 987068.
- Philp, Mark (2024). Introduction. Volney: 'The Ruins' and 'Catechism of Natural Law'. By Volney, C. F. Kidd, Colin (ed.). Cambridge Texts in the History of Political Thought. Cambridge University Press. pp. viii–xxxi.
- Ricciardi, Maurizio (2015). "L'ideologia come scienza politica del sociale". Scienza & Politica. Per Una Storia delle Dottrine (in Italian). 27 (52): 165–195. doi:10.6092/ISSN.1825-9618/5282.
- Roberts, William Clare (7 March 2025). "Ideology". Stanford Encyclopedia of Philosophy.
- Rosen, Frederick (24 July 2003). Classical Utilitarianism from Hume to Mill. London: Routledge. p. 83. ISBN 0-203-98735-7.
- Shields, James (1995). "Idéologues". In France, Peter (ed.). The New Oxford Companion to Literature in French. Oxford University Press. ISBN 9780198661252.
- Sonenscher, Michael (1 March 2009). "Ideology, social science and general facts in late eighteenth-century French political thought". History of European Ideas. 35 (1): 24–37. doi:10.1016/j.histeuroideas.2008.09.006. ISSN 0191-6599.
- Staum, Martin S. (1996). Minerva's Message: Stabilizing the French Revolution. Montreal; Buffalo: McGill–Queen's University Press. ISBN 9780773514423.
- Staum, Martin S. (2002). "Idéologues". In Kors, Alan Charles (ed.). Encyclopedia of the Enlightenment. Oxford University Press.
- Stråth, Bo (2013). "Ideology and Conceptual History". In Freeden, Michael; Stears, Marc (eds.). The Oxford Handbook of Political Ideologies. Oxford University Press. pp. 3–19.
- Tiran, André (2020). "Les idéologues, la Décade philosophique politique et littéraire et Jean-Baptiste Say". Journal of Interdisciplinary History of Ideas (in French). 9 (17). GISI - Università di Torino. doi:10.13135/2280-8574/4261. ISSN 2280-8574.
- Turner, Jonathan H. (1998). "The Sociology of Auguste Comte". The Emergence of Sociological Theory (PDF). Thousand Oaks, CA: SAGE Publications. pp. 39–55.
- Wokler, Robert (2006). "Ideology and the Origins of Social Science". In Goldie, Mark; Wokler, Robert (eds.). The Cambridge History of Eighteenth-Century Political Thought. Cambridge University Press. pp. 688–710. doi:10.1017/CHOL9780521374224.026. ISBN 978-0-521-37422-4.
