= Les Neuf Sœurs =

French Masonic Lodge

La Loge des Neuf Sœurs (French pronunciation: [la lɔʒ de nœf sœʁ]; The Nine Sisters), established in Paris in 1734, was a prominent French Masonic Lodge of the Grand Orient de France that was influential in organising French support for the American Revolution. A "Société des Neuf Sœurs," a charitable society that surveyed academic curricula, had been active at the Académie Royale des Sciences since 1769. Its name referred to the nine Muses, the daughters of Mnemosyne/Memory, patrons of the arts and sciences since antiquity, and long significant in French cultural circles. The Lodge of similar name and purpose was opened in 1776, by Jérôme de Lalande. From the start of the French Revolution in 1789 until 1792, Les Neuf Sœurs became a "Société Nationale".

During the French Revolution, while the Académie Royale des Sciences et des Arts was drastically reorganised, two members of the lodge, Antoine Laurent de Jussieu and Gilbert Romme, in collaboration with Henri Grégoire, helped to organise a "Société Libre des Sciences, Belles Lettres et Arts", to subsidise what had become the Institut de France so as to keep the original influence of the "Neuf Soeurs" intact. (Hahn, 1971) The lodge was reconstituted under its original name in 1805, ceased operation from 1829 to 1836, and finally closed in 1848. Its former location is thought to be on the Rue de la Bûcherie on the Left Bank across from Notre-Dame.

Its successive "Venerable Masters" of the first decade were Benjamin Franklin (1779–1781), Marquis de La Salle (1781–1783), Milly (1783–1784), Charles Dupaty (1784), Elie de Beaumont (1784–1785), and Claude Pastoret (1788–1789) (Ligou, 1987).

== The Americans ==
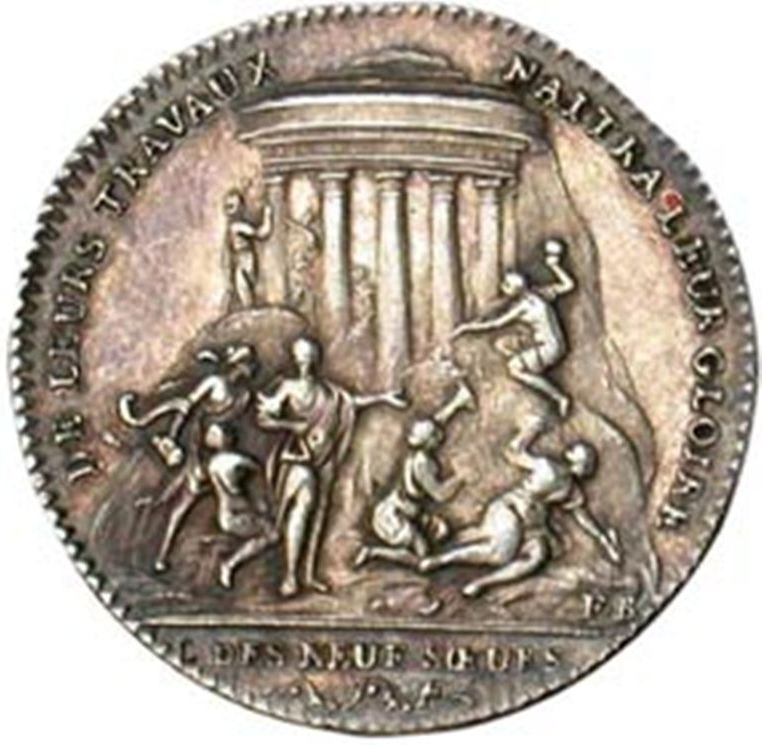
A token from Les Neuf Sœurs (1783).

In 1778, the year Voltaire became a member, Benjamin Franklin and John Paul Jones also were accepted along with Jean Sylvain Bailly. Benjamin Franklin became Master of the Lodge in 1779, and was re-elected in 1780. Franklin, after a long and influential stay in Europe, returned to America to participate in the writing of the Constitution. Thomas Jefferson, who was not a Mason, took over as American Envoy.

Jean-Antoine Houdon, a member of Les Neuf Sœurs, added Jefferson's marble bust to his corpus of works, which included busts of Franklin and General Lafayette. Jefferson persuaded Houdon to make his famous statue of George Washington, for which Houdon travelled to America in 1785.

While Jefferson stayed in Paris, at the Maison des Feuillants, his neighbour was Jean-François Marmontel, Secretary-for-Life of the Paris Academy of Sciences and another member of the Lodge. At the same time, Jefferson's friend, American Founding Father John Adams, was the neighbour of Anne-Catherine de Ligniville, Madame Helvétius, who hosted the famous Cercle d'Auteuil, where the influence of Les Neuf Sœurs was at its highest.

In Mémoires pour servir à l'histoire du Jacobinisme (4 vol.,1797–1798), Abbé Barruel attributed membership to key figures of the French Revolution, like Georges Danton and Jacques Pierre Brissot (Barruel claims Brissot was a member of Neuf Soeurs, and Brissot wrote that he was initiated into a German Lodge, but there is no proof he was ever active.).

== Members ==
- Voltaire (1694–1778) — Initiated on April 4, 1778, in Paris; his conductors were Benjamin Franklin and Antoine Court de Gébelin. He died the following month. His membership however was symbolic of the independence of mind Les Neuf Sœurs stood for.
- Benjamin Franklin (1706–1790)
- John Paul Jones (1747–1792)
- Jean-Nicolas Démeunier (1751–1814)
- Claude-Emmanuel de Pastoret (1755–1840)
- Antoine Court de Gébelin (1725–1784)
- Camille Desmoulins (1760–1794)
- Louis-Marcelin de Fontanes (1757–1821)
- Nicolas François de Neufchâteau (1750–1828)
- Jean-Baptiste Greuze (1725–1805)
- Jean-Antoine Houdon (1741–1828)
- Nicolas Dalayrac (1753–1809)
- Bernard de Lacépède (1756–1825)
- Adrien-Nicolas Piédefer, marquis de La Salle (1735–1818)
- Carle Vernet (1758–1835)
- Jean-François Marmontel (1723–1799)
- Pierre-Louis Ginguené (1748–1815)
- Jacques Montgolfier (1745–1799)
- Niccolò Piccinni (1728–1800)
- Emmanuel Joseph Sieyès (1748–1836)
- Nicolas Chamfort (1741–1794)
- Joseph-Ignace Guillotin (1738–1794)
- Dominique Joseph Garat (1749–1833)
- Pierre Jean George Cabanis (1757–1808)
- Jérôme Lalande (1732–1807)
- Nicolas Bricaire de la Dixmerie (1731?–1791)
- Jean-Michel Moreau le Jeune (1741–1814)
- Alexander Sergeyevich Stroganov (1733–1811)
- Jean Sylvain Bailly (1736–1793) and Marquis de Condorcet (1743–1794) are often listed as members but no documentation exists as proof.
- Eugenio Martin Izquierdo de Rivera y Lazaún (1776–?)
- François Lays (1758–1831)

Jean Baptiste Moulon de la Chesnaye
