= Antoine Destutt de Tracy =

French aristocrat and philosopher (1754–1836)

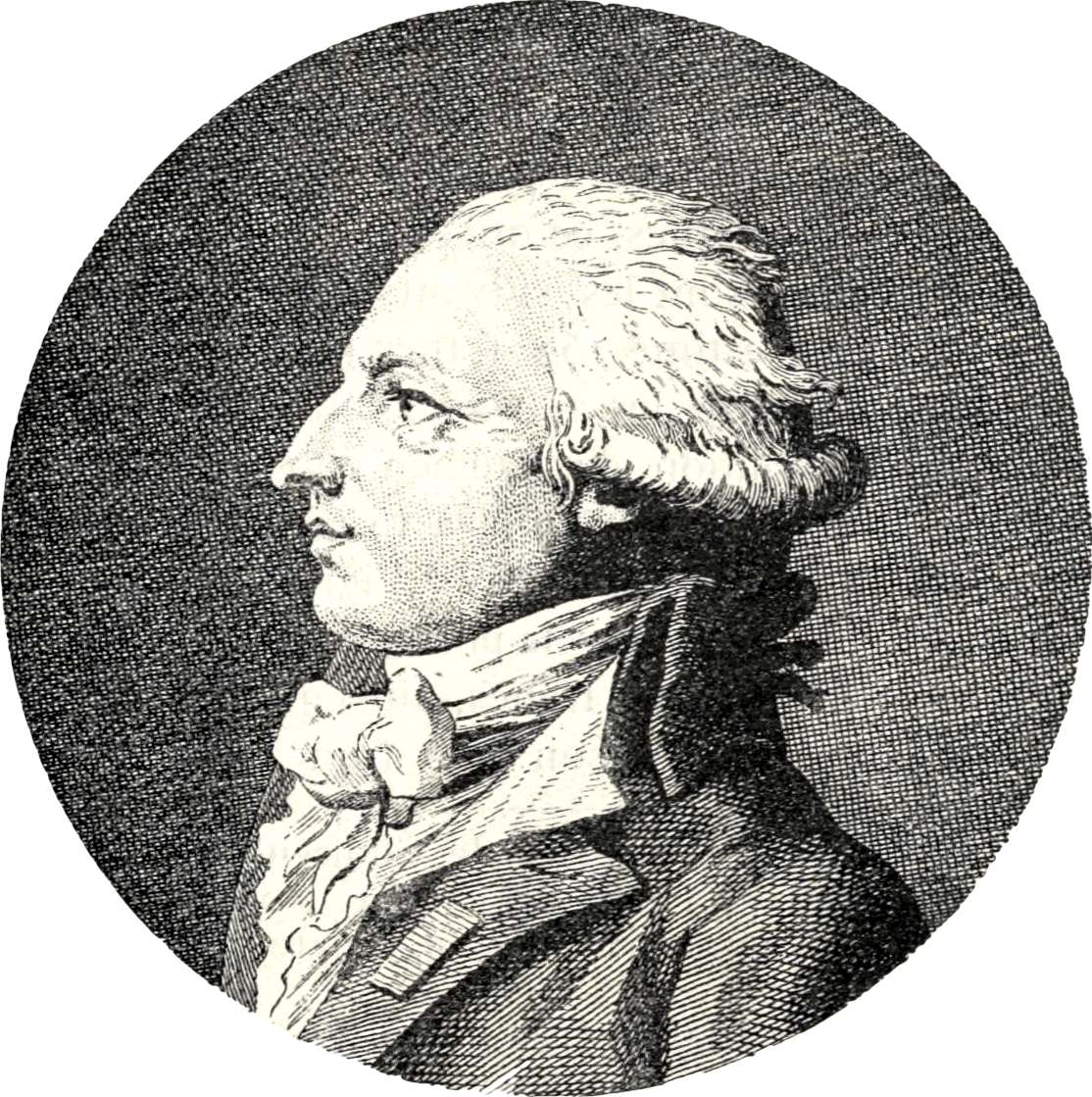
- Born: Antoine Louis Claude Destutt; 20 July 1754; Paris, Kingdom of France
- Died: 9 March 1836 (aged 81); Paris, Kingdom of France
- Children: Victor Destutt de Tracy and Emilie Destutt de Tracy

Philosophical work
- School: French Liberal School
- Notable ideas: Ideology

Antoine Louis Claude Destutt, comte de Tracy (French: [dɛstyt də tʁasi]; 20 July 1754 – 9 March 1836) was a French Enlightenment aristocrat and philosopher who coined the term "ideology" and was the leading theorist of the idéologues.

== Biography ==
The son of a distinguished soldier, Claude Destutt, he was born in Paris. His family was of Scottish descent, tracing its origin to Walter Stutt, who had accompanied the Earls of Buchan and Douglas to the court of France in 1420 and whose family afterwards rose to be counts of Tracy. He was educated at home and at the University of Strasbourg, where he was noted for his athletic skill. He went into the army and when the French Revolution broke out he took an active part in the provincial assembly of Bourbonnais. Elected a deputy of the nobility to the Estates General, he sat alongside his friend, the Marquis de La Fayette. In the spring of 1792, he received the rank of maréchal de camp in command of the cavalry in the army of the north, but the influence of the extremists becoming predominant he took indefinite leave of absence and settled at Auteuil, where with Condorcet and Cabanis he devoted himself to scientific studies. Under the Reign of Terror, he was arrested and imprisoned for nearly a year, during which he studied Étienne Bonnot de Condillac and John Locke and abandoned the natural sciences for philosophy.

In 1795, he was named associate of the Institut de France when it was first established. On the motion of Cabanis, he was named in the class of the moral and political sciences. He soon began to attract attention by the memoires which he read before his colleagues—papers which formed the first draft of his comprehensive work on ideology, named Eléments d'idéologie. He conceived of ideology as the "science of ideas". The society of "ideologists" at Auteuil embraced, besides Cabanis and Tracy, Constantin-François de Chassebœuf, Comte de Volney and Dominique Joseph Garat, professor in the National Institute. Along with some of these colleagues, he was a member of the cultural society Les Neuf Sœurs. In 1802, his daughter, Émilie Destutt de Tracy married Georges Washington de La Fayette, son of the Marquis de Lafayette. In 1806, he was elected to the American Philosophical Society in Philadelphia.

Under the Empire, Tracy was a member of the senate, but he took little part in its deliberations. Under the Restoration, he became a peer of France, but protested against the reactionary split of the government and remained in opposition. In 1808, he was elected a member of the Académie française in place of Cabanis and in 1832 was also named a member of the Academy of Moral Sciences on its reorganization. He appeared only once at its conferences, owing to his age and to disappointment at the comparative failure of his work. Destutt de Tracy was one of the principal advocates of liberalism during and after the Revolution. He died in Paris.

== Philosophy ==
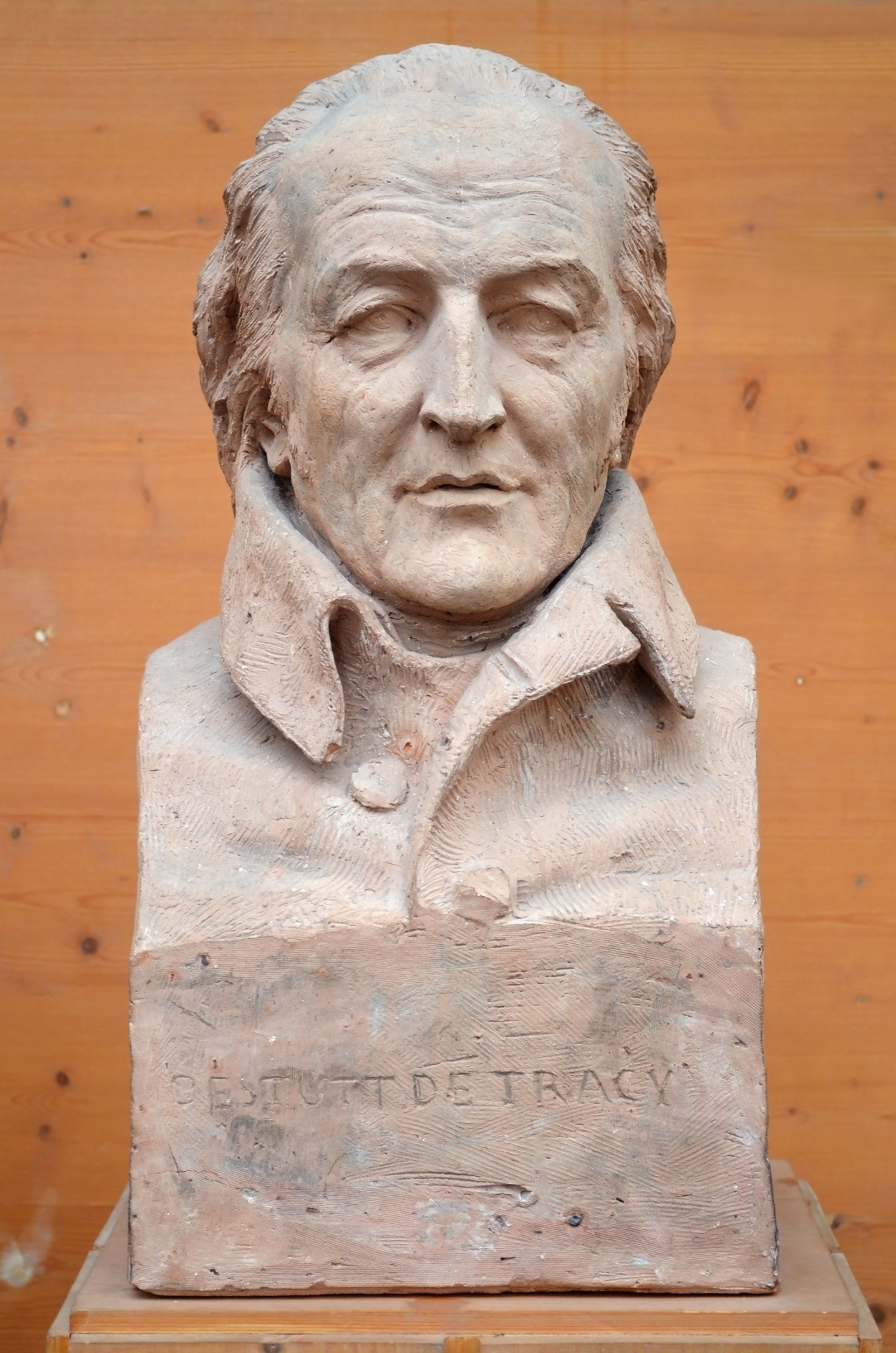
Bust of Destutt de Tracy by David d'Angers (1837)

Destutt de Tracy was the last eminent representative of the sensualistic school which Condillac founded in France upon a one-sided interpretation of Locke. In full agreement with the materialist views of Cabanis, de Tracy pushed the sensualist principles of Condillac to their most necessary consequences. While the attention of Cabanis was devoted mostly to the physiological side of man, Tracy's interests concerned the then newly determined "ideological", in contrast to "psychological", sides of humanity. His grounding notion of ideology, he frankly stated, should be classified as "a part of zoology" (biology). The four faculties into which de Tracy divides the conscious life—perception, memory, judgment and volition—are all varieties of sensation. Perception is sensation caused by a present affection of the external extremities of the nerves; memory is sensation caused in the absence of present excitation by dispositions of the nerves which are the result of past experiences; judgment is the perception of relations between sensations and is itself a species of sensation because if we are aware of the sensations we must be aware also of the relations between them; and volition he identifies with the feeling of desire and is therefore included as a type of sensation.

Considered for the influences of his philosophy, de Tracy minimally deserves credit for his distinction between active and passive touch which ultimately fed the development of psychological theories of muscular sense. His account of the notion of external existence as being derived not from pure sensation, but from the experience of action on the one hand and resistance on the other, stands in this light to be compared with the works of Alexander Bain and later psychologists.

== Works ==
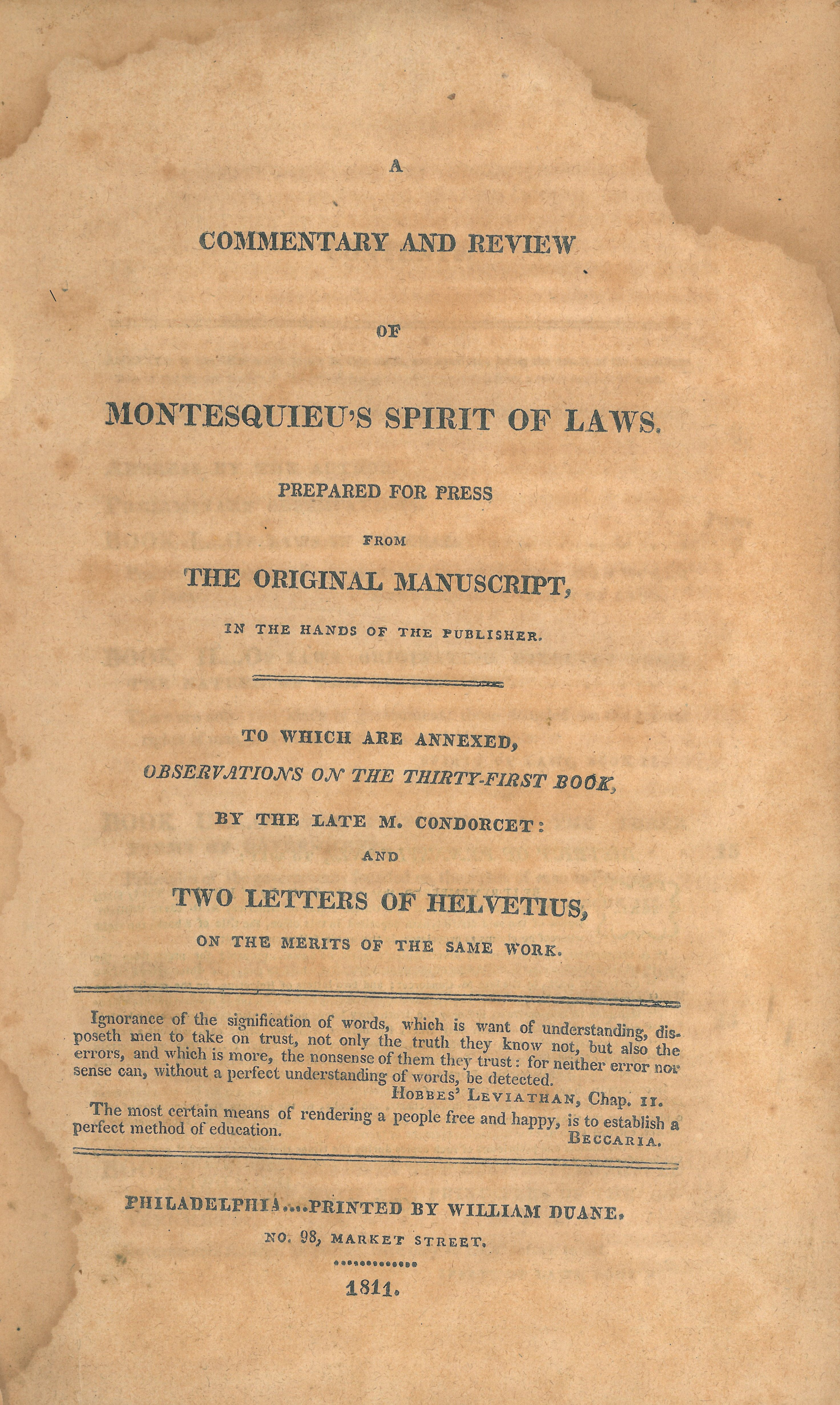
The title page of A Commentary and Review of Montesquieu's Spirit of Laws (1811), an English translation by Thomas Jefferson of Destutt de Tracy's Commentaire sur l'esprit des lois de Montesquieu (1806)

His chief works are the five-volume Éléments d'idéologie (1817–1818), the first volume of which was presented as "Ideology Strictly Defined" and which completed the arguments made in earlier completed monographs; Commentaire sur l'esprit des lois de Montesquieu (1806) and Essai sur le génie, et les ouvrages de Montesquieu (1808). The fourth volume of the Eléments d'idéologie the author regarded as the introduction to a second section of the planned nine-part work which he titled Traité de la volonté (Treatise on the Will and Its Effects). When translated into English, editor Thomas Jefferson retitled the volume A Treatise on Political Economy which obscured the aspects of Tracy's work concerned not with politics but with far more basic questions of will and the possibility of understanding the conditions of its determinations.

== Legacy ==
Tracy advanced a rigorous use of deductive method in social theory, seeing economics in terms of actions (praxeology) and exchanges (catallactics). Tracy's influence can be seen both on the Continent (particularly on Stendhal, Augustin Thierry, Auguste Comte and Charles Dunoyer) and in the United States, where the general approach of the French Liberal School of political economy competed evenly with British classical political economy well until the end of the 19th century as evidenced in the work and reputation of Arthur Latham Perry and others. In his political writings Tracy rejected monarchism, favoring the American republican form of government. This republicanism as well as his advocacy of reason in philosophy and laissez-faire for economic policy lost him favor with Napoleon, who turned Tracy's coinage of "ideology" into a term of abuse. Karl Marx followed this vein of invective to refer to Tracy as a "fischblütige Bourgeoisdoktrinär" (a "fish-blooded bourgeois doctrinaire").

On the other hand, Thomas Jefferson thought highly enough of Destutt de Tracy's work to ready two of his manuscripts for American publication. In his preface to the 1817 publication, Jefferson wrote: "By diffusing sound principles of Political Economy, it will protect the public industry from the parasite institutions now consuming it." Tracy's criticism of Montesquieu and his endorsement of representative democracy were influential on Jefferson's thinking.

Stendhal was much influenced by Tracy's enlightenment ideals and attended the de Tracy salon regularly in the 1820s as he described in Memoirs of an Egotist. According to Richard Stites, he was important to the liberals of the 1820s:

Franco Venturi noted that the Commentary "resounded throughout the whole period of the liberal revolutions, from the Spain of 1820 to the Russia of 1825." An American historian wrote that "the Russian Decembrists, along with numerous other liberals, Carbonari, and revolutionaries of the 1820s used this Commentary as their political Bible." The Decembrist Mikhail Orlov recalled that his circle considered it "the epitome of wisdom."

== See also ==
- Victor Destutt de Tracy, his son
