= Nicolas Bricaire de la Dixmerie =

Nicolas Bricaire de la Dixmerie (c. 1730 – November 26, 1791), French man of letters, was born at Lamothe (Haute-Marne). While still young he moved to Paris, where the rest of his life was spent in literary activity.

His numerous works include Contes philosophiques et moraux (1765), Les Deux Ages du goût et du génie sous Louis XIV et sous Louis XV (1769), a parallel and contrast, in which the decision is given in favor of the latter; L'Espagne littéraire (1774); Eloge de Voltaire (1779) and Eloge de Montaigne (1781).

== See also ==
- Les Neuf Sœurs
