= Memoirs of an Egotist =

1832 text by Stendhal

Souvenirs d’égotisme
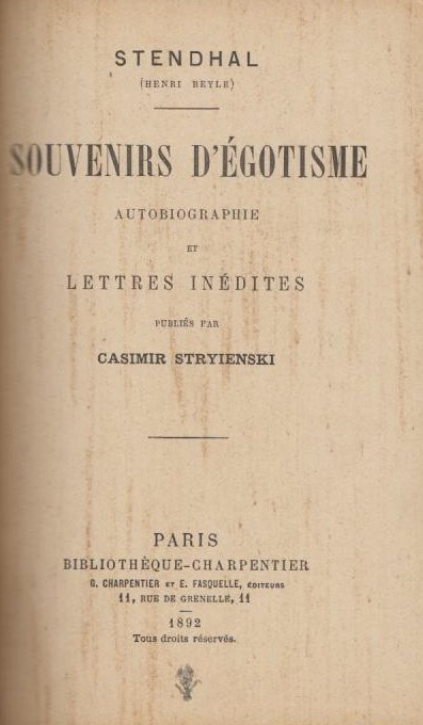
- Title page for Souvenirs d’égotisme (1892)
- Author: Stendhal (Henri Beyle)
- Original title: Souvenirs d’égotisme
- Language: French
- Genre: Autobiography
- Published: 1892
- Publication place: France

Souvenirs d’égotisme (French for Memoirs of an Egotist) is an autobiographical work by Stendhal. It was written in 13 days in June and July 1832 while the author was staying in Civitavecchia. Stendhal recounts his life in Paris and London from 1821 to 1830. It includes candid and spirited descriptions of contemporaries such as Lafayette, Madame Pasta, Destutt de Tracy, Mérimée, and Charles de Rémusat. The story remained unfinished and was not published until 1892 by Casimir Stryienski.

== Composition and background ==
Stendhal began to write Memoirs of an Egotist on June 20, 1832, approximately one year after having taken a post as French Consul in Civitavecchia. He was forty-nine and undertook to describe his years in Paris between 1821 and 1830, but sometimes misremembered the dates of events and included incidents that happened earlier. In Paris, Stendhal was active in the literary world and wrote for London periodicals, which paid well. When his literary prospects dried up in 1826 and again in 1828, Stendhal began to look for a government post. His friends managed to secure for him a position first in Trieste and then, following a confrontation with Austrian police, in Civitavecchia. Stendhal put aside the manuscript for Memoirs of an Egotist for good on July 4, 1832. The approximately 40,000 words of Memoirs of an Egotist were therefore written in 13 days.

== Summary ==
Memoirs of an Egotist describes Stendhal's life in Paris and London from 1821 to 1830, after having spent 1814 to 1821 in Italy. The nine-and-a-half years that Stendhal spent in Paris were the longest he had spent anywhere except for his time in Grenoble as a child. Stendhal left Italy in 1821 for a number of reasons, including distrust from both liberals (who thought he was a spy for the police) and the police (who thought he was a dangerous liberal). Métilde Dembowski, for whom Stendhal conceived a great passion while in Milan, either did not reciprocate his love or was unwilling to consummate it. In Memoirs of an Egotist Stendhal portrays the situation as one of perfectly requited love that is somehow kept from fruition; the critic Michael Wood puts it, "She loved him but wouldn't sleep with him. He left."

Stendhal lists his bad characteristics next to his admirable ones, and does not shrink from describing moments of humiliation or silliness, including an account of a visit to a brothel that occasioned a short-lived reputation for impotence among his friends. Memoirs of an Egotist describes likewise many missed opportunities for friendship or advantageous networking. Upon his arrival in Paris, he developed a friendship with a Baron de Lussinge, who was as frugal as Stendhal. But de Lussigne became rich and miserly, and patronised Stendhal's poverty. Stendhal changed his café so as not to have to see his former friend. During this time in Paris, Stendhal was becoming known as a writer of works on music and art, but he received savage reviews, which he cushioned by musing that "one or other of us must be wrong". He was known as a liberal and "as part of Napoleon's Court". When offered by the Chief of Police in 1814 the post of food controller of Paris, he refused. The man who accepted became rich in four or five years, Stendhal says, "without stealing".

Stendhal describes a handful of love affairs he declined even when the memory of his Métilde had become "a tender, profoundly sad ghost, who, by her apparitions, inclined me powerfully to ideas of tenderness, kindness, justice and indulgence." Michael Wood interprets the narrative as an account of Stendhal's recovery from his infatuation with Métilde. Stendhal says, "It was only by chance, and in 1824, three years later, that I had a mistress. Only then was the memory of Métilde less rending..."

He also describes a trip to England, with which he hoped to combat his low spirits, and to see the plays of Shakespeare. Elsewhere in Memoirs of an Egotist Stendhal asserts that the only loves in his life have been Cimarosa, Mozart, and Shakespeare. He saw Edmund Kean in Othello, and records his astonishment that in France and in England they used different gestures to express the same emotions; he also was impressed that Kean delivered his lines as if thinking of them for the first time.
