= Anne-Catherine de Ligniville, Madame Helvétius =

French salon hostess and feline lover (1722–1800)

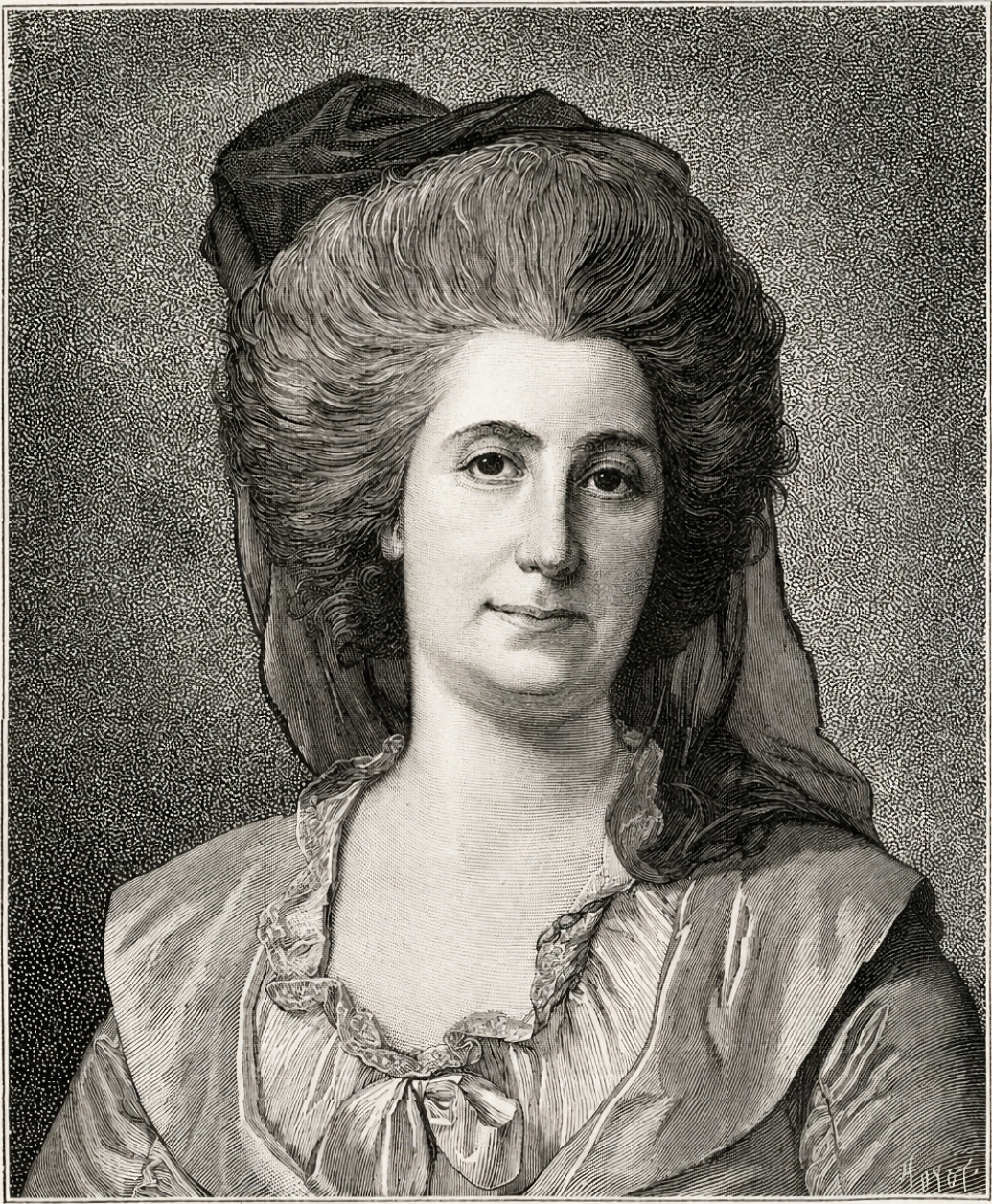
Anne-Catherine de Ligniville Helvétius

Anne-Catherine de Ligniville, Madame Helvétius (23 July 1722 – 12 August 1800), also Anne-Catherine de Ligniville d'Autricourt, nicknamed "Minette", maintained a renowned salon in France in the eighteenth century.

== Life ==
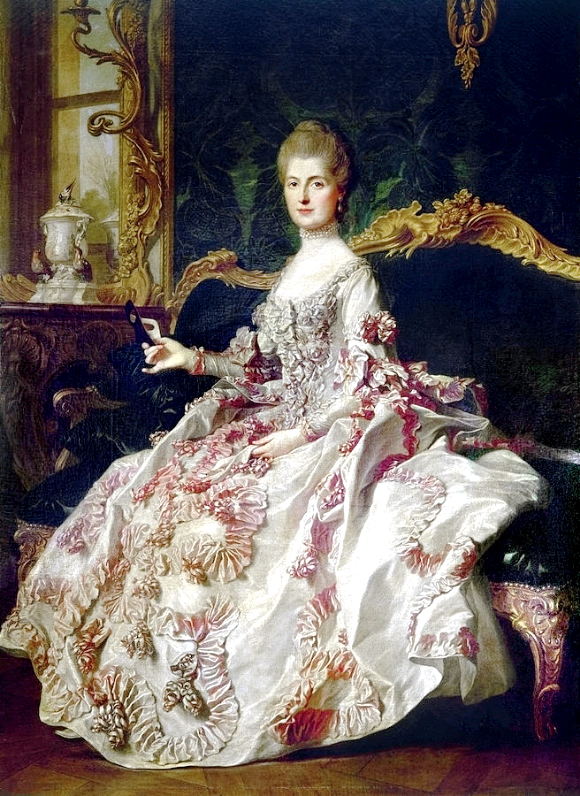
Anne-Catherine de Ligniville Helvétius

One of the twenty-one children of Jean-Jacques de Ligniville and his wife Charlotte de Saureau, Anne-Catherine de Ligniville, the niece of Madame de Graffigny, married the philosopher Helvétius in 1751. By the time he died twenty years later, the couple had amassed a vast fortune, and with it Madame Helvétius maintained her salon which featured the greatest figures of the Enlightenment for over five decades.

Among the habitués of Madame Helvétius's salon were Julie de Lespinasse and Suzanne Necker, writers Fontenelle, Diderot, Chamfort, Duclos, Saint-Lambert, Marmontel, Roucher, Saurin, André Chénier, and Volney. Thinkers such as Condorcet, d'Holbach, Turgot, Abbé Sieyès, Abbé Galiani, Destutt de Tracy, Abbé Beccaria, Abbé Morellet, Buffon, Condillac or Abbé Raynal mingled with such scientists as d'Alembert, Lavoisier, Cuvier and Cabanis. The sculptor Houdon, Baron Gérard and other leading figures of the time such as Charles-Joseph Panckoucke and François-Ambroise Didot were also attendees. Such politicians as Malesherbes, Talleyrand, Madame Roland and her husband Roland de la Platière, Thomas Jefferson, Benjamin Franklin (who is claimed to have proposed marriage to her), Mirabeau, Pierre Daunou, Garat, Nicolas Bergasse and Napoléon Bonaparte could also be found at her salon.

The Storming of the Bastille led to a parting of the ways among Enlightened opinion in general and Madame Helvétius's salon did not escape that. The more conservative members, such as Morellet, Marmontel and Suard withdrew. Morellet did his best to persuade her to stay neutral but to no avail as she sided with more radical leaders such as Volney and Sieyès.

The salon also provided a steady home for a great clowder of Angora cats. The cats were a well-known feature of Madame Helvétius's salon, always bedecked with silk ribbons and doted on by their loving caregiver. Eighteen in all, the cats were kept company by the Madame's dogs, canaries, and many other pets.

Madame Helvétius died at Auteuil.

== In popular culture ==
Madame Helvétius appears in the 2008 television drama series John Adams, in which she is played by Judith Magre.

Madame Helvétius is mentioned briefly in the Robert Lawson children's book Ben and Me (1939) as having many important people at her dinners, and also having cats (distressing to the protagonist, who is a mouse) and a particularly disagreeable dog.

She is portrayed in the Apple TV series " Franklin " by Jeanne Balibar.
