= Ponce Denis Écouchard Lebrun =

French lyric poet

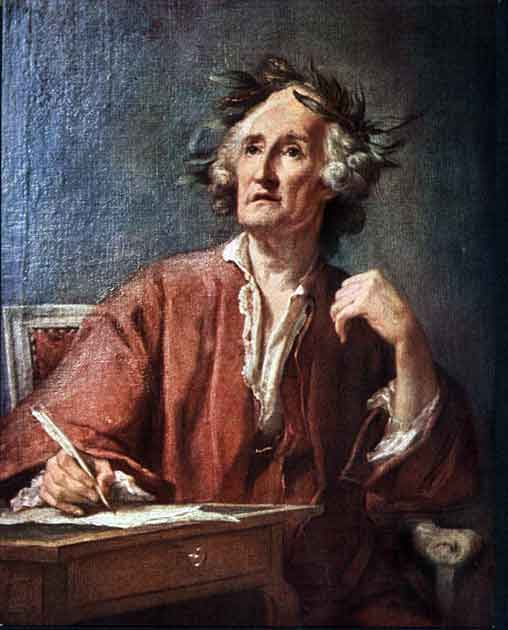
Ponce Denis Écouchard Lebrun

Ponce Denis Écouchard Lebrun (11 August 1729 – 31 August 1807) was a French lyric poet.

== Biography ==
Lebrun was born in Paris at the house of the prince de Conti, to whom his father was valet. Among Lebrun's school friends was a son of Louis Racine, whose disciple he became. In 1755 he published an Ode sur les désastres de Lisbonne. In 1759 he married Marie Anne de Surcourt, addressed in his Élégies as Fanny. In the early years of his marriage he produced his poem, Nature. His wife suffered much from his violent temper, and when in 1774 she brought an action against him to obtain a separation, she was supported by Lebrun's own mother and sister.

Lebrun had been secrétaire des commandements to the prince de Conti, and on his patron's death he lost this position. He also lost financially as a result of the bankruptcy of the prince de Guemene. To this period belongs a long poem, the Veillées des Muses, which remained unfinished, and his ode to Georges-Louis Leclerc, Comte de Buffon, which ranks among his best works.

Dependent on government pensions he changed his politics with the times. He praised Calonne, comparing him with the great Sully, and likened Louis XVI to Henri IV, but he ended up as the Reign of Terror's official poet. He occupied rooms in the Louvre, and fulfilled his obligations by shameless attacks on the king and queen. His excellent ode on the Vengeur and the Ode nationale contre l'Angleterre on the occasion of the projected invasion of Britain were written in honour of the power of Napoleon.

This "versatility" damaged Lebrun's reputation, making it difficult to appreciate his real merit. He had a genius for epigram, and the quatrains and dizains directed against his many enemies have a verve generally lacking in his odes. The one directed against La Harpe is called by Sainte-Beuve the "queen of epigrams."

La Harpe has said that the poet, called by his friends, perhaps with a spice of irony, Lebrun-Pindare, had written many fine strophes but not one good ode. The critic exposed mercilessly the obscurities and unlucky images which occur even in the ode to Buffon, and advised the author to imitate the simplicity and energy that adorned Buffon's prose. His works were published by his friend PL Ginguené in 1811. The best of them are included in Prosper Poitevin's "Petits poètes français," which forms part of the "Panthéon littéraire".
