= Louis Racine =

French poet (1692–1763)

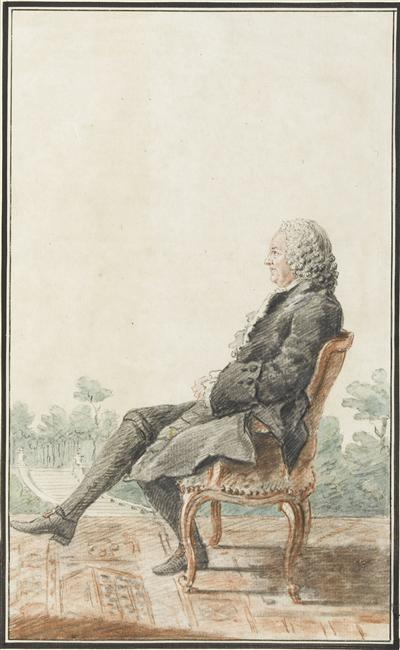
- Louis Racine by the artist Carmontelle
- Born: 6 November 1692; Paris, France
- Died: 29 January 1763 (aged 70); Paris, France
- Occupations: poet, tax inspector
- Relatives: Jean Racine (father)
- Writing career
- Language: French
- Period: Age of the Enlightenment
- Genres: poetry, essays
- Subjects: religion, philosophy, literature
- Notable works: La Grâce (1722), La Religion (1742)

Louis Racine (6 November 1692 – 29 January 1763) was a French poet of the Age of the Enlightenment.

== Life ==
Racine was born on 6 November 1692 in Paris. The second son and the seventh and last child of the celebrated tragic dramatist Jean Racine, he was interested in poetry from childhood but was dissuaded from trying to make it his career by the poet Boileau on the grounds that the gift never existed in two successive generations. However, in 1719 Racine became a member of the Académie des Inscriptions and published his first major poem, La Grâce, in 1722. But, because of the poem's Jansenist inspiration, Cardinal de Fleury, chief minister of Louis XV, blocked the poet's admission to the Académie Française, and instead Racine was induced to accept the post of inspector-general of taxes at Marseille in Provence.

For the next 24 years, although he continued to write poetry, Racine worked as a tax inspector in various provincial towns and cities, marrying in 1728. His most important poem, La Religion, in which he was careful to avoid further accusations of Jansenism, was published in 1742. He eventually retired from government service in 1746, aged 54, and returned to Paris where he devoted himself to his writing.

In November 1755, he lost his only son and his daughter-in-law when they were swept away by the tsunami from the Lisbon earthquake while on honeymoon at Cádiz in Spain. This tragedy, commemorated by the French poet Écouchard-Lebrun, is said to have broken Racine's spirit. He sold his large library, gave up writing, and devoted himself now to the practice of religion. It was around this time that Racine wrote his last published work, an essay on the famous feral child of 18th-century France Marie-Angélique Memmie Le Blanc whom he had interviewed and written of in his philosophical poem L'Épître II sur l'homme (1747) (Second Epistle on Man).

Louis Racine was characterised by Voltaire, the leading French intellectual of his day, as le bon versificateur Racine, fils du grand Racine ("the good versifier Racine, son of the great Racine"). His Oeuvres complètes (complete works) were collected in six volumes and published in Paris in 1808. He was said by his contemporaries to have been a very personable, humble man who was sincerely pious and fluent in seven languages.
