= Francesco Saverio Salfi =

Italian writer and politician

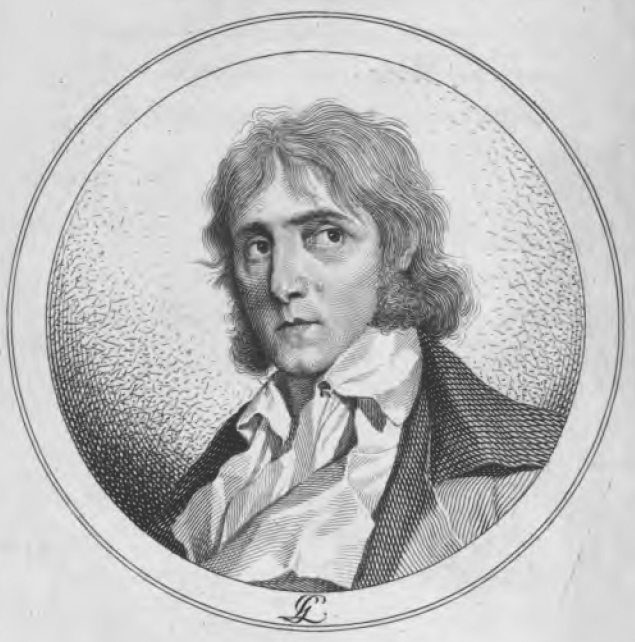
- Born: 24 January 1759; Cosenza, Kingdom of Naples
- Died: 1832 (aged 72–73); Paris, France
- Occupations: Ordained priest, writer, politician, librettist

Francesco Saverio Salfi or Franco Salfi (24 January 1759 in Cosenza – 1832 in Paris) was an Italian writer, politician and librettist.

== Biography ==
An ordained priest, he distinguished himself with his ability to compose verses at a very young age at Accademia Cosentina. In 1786, he wrote an essay arguing against popular beliefs related to the 1783 Calabrian earthquakes. The essay attracted fury from the ecclesiastical authorities, who however were unable to prosecute Salfi due to opposition from the Neapolitan government, particularly Minister Carlo de Marco. In 1787 he moved to Naples, where he lectured in the Humanities, came into contact with Enlightenment thinkers (Gaetano Filangieri, Mario Pagano, Antonio Jerocades, Nicola Pacifico and others), and progressively distanced himself from the Church. In 1788, when Ferdinand IV of Naples refused to pay the annual tribute of the Chinèa to the Pope, Salfi wrote a satire against the Papal States and in praise of the Neapolitan government.

Salfi's hopes for an Enlightened reform of the Neapolitan monarchy were dashed when, in reaction to the outbreak of the French Revolution, the Neapolitan government turned ultra-conservative, abandoning plans for reform and severing diplomatic relations with France. In 1792, he was one of the intellectuals who met with French Admiral Latouche-Tréville, who had come to Naples to obtain apologies from the King. In the same year, Salfi joined the newly founded Neapolitan Patriotic Society, a Masonic lodge modelled on the Jacobin Club, whose members were planning a violent insurrection. The conspiracy was discovered and in 1794, to avoid a trial, Salfi escaped from Naples to Genoa, where he quit the priesthood, and then to Milan, where he shortened his name to "Franco" and actively collaborated with the Republican newspaper Lombardy's Political Thermometer. In this period he devoted himself to the theatre, writing plays aimed at a popular audience. In addition to the satire of General Colli, for example, he translated the first part of the Declaration of 1789 into a play.

Salfi returned to Naples with General Championnet on 5 December 1798 and took on the role of Secretary of the provisional government of the Neapolitan Republic. In February 1799, after Ignazio Ciaia had replaced Carlo Lauberg as President of the Neapolitan Republic, he left for France. There, he contributed articles about Italian literature to the literary periodicals Biographie Universelle and Revue encyclopédique. Salfi went back to Italy in 1800, following the Battle of Marengo. He found employment as teacher of logic and metaphysics, and later history and law at the gymnasium of Brera.

Salfi was a member of the Masonic Lodge Amalia Augusta, founded in 1806 in Brescia. He also became an adviser to Joachim Murat. In 1815 he moved permanently to France, but continued to play a role in Italian politics. For instance, in 1831 he wrote with Filippo Buonarroti a Proclamation to the Italian People from the Alps to Mount Etna, in support of a republican uprising organised by a group of Italian political exiles with the help of La Fayette. The Proclamation argued that "there can be no freedom without independence, no independence without strength, and no strength without unity. Then let us spare no effort to make Italy independent, unified, and free as soon as possible", and ended with "may tyrants fall, may their crowns fall into pieces and from their ruins the Italian republic shall rise, one and indivisible from the Alps to the sea".

As a poet, Salfi composed lyrics on Napoleon, a free-verse poem on the lynching of Hugou de Basseville (in a dispute with Monti), as well as some tragedies inspired by Alfieri (such as Virginia bresciana in 1797, Pausania in 1801) and many librettos. Today he is remembered mostly as the author of the discourses on history Dell'uso dell'istoria (1807) e Dell'influenza della storia (1815), L'Italie au dix-neuvième siècle (1821) and above all the continuation of the literary history of Italy by Ginguené, published posthumously. Salfi's own Manuale della storia della letteratura italiana, which also appeared posthumously in 1834, is an important work. Salfi described it as "an historical essay on the literature of Italy" and adopted an innovative division into periods starting from the 75th year of each century and ending with the 75th year of the following one, thus achieving a less fragmented vision of Italian literature than was the case in other contemporary accounts.

== Bibliography ==
- Franco Crispini, Appartenenze illuministiche: i calabresi Francesco Saverio Salfi e Francesco Antonio Grimaldi, Cosenza: Klipper, 2004, ISBN 88-88223-06-1
- F.S. Salfi, Valentina Zaffino (ed.), «Progressioni» dell'uomo. Verso la "civil società". [Lezioni di Diritto pubblico, o delle genti, V-X], Cosenza, Pellegrini, 2010, ISBN 978-88-8101-673-0
- F.S. Salfi, Franco Crispini (ed.), "Introduzione" di Valentina Zaffino, Elogio di Filangieri, Cosenza, Pellegrini, 2012, ISBN 978-88-8101-863-5
- Daniel Winkler, "Francesco Saverio Salfi", in D.W., Körper, Revolution, Nation. Vittorio Alfieri und das republikanische Tragödienprojekt der Sattelzeit. Wilhelm Fink, München 2016, ISBN 978-3-7705-6129-2. pp. 227–272.
- Entry on Francesco Salfi in the 'Radical Translations' project website: https://radicaltranslations.org/database/agents/1211/#bio
