= Pierre-Louis Ginguené =

French author

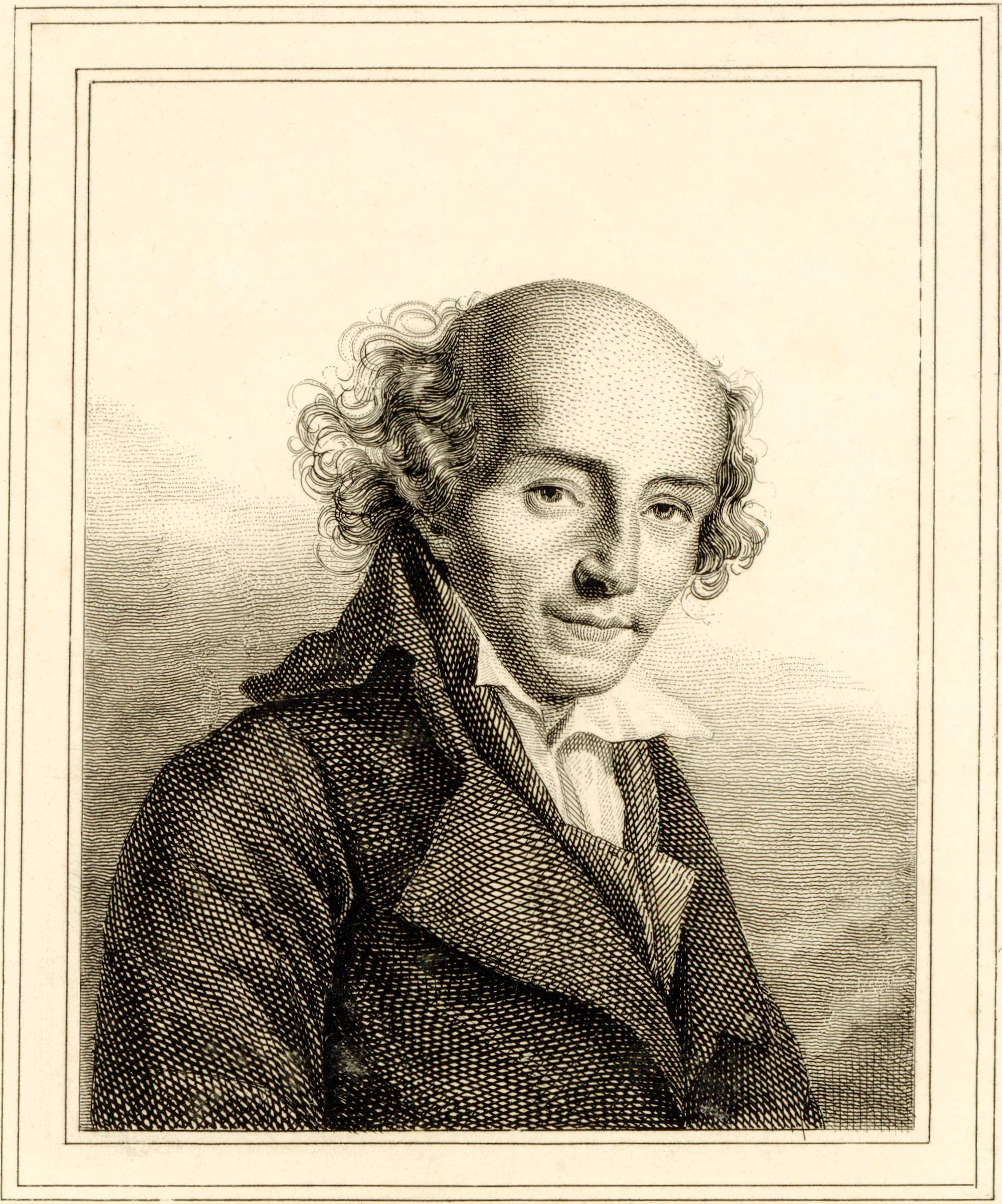
An 1830 lithograph after a painting by Henri-Pierre Danloux

Pierre-Louis Ginguené (25 April 1748 – 16 November 1816) was a French author.

== Biography ==
He was born at Rennes, in Brittany, and educated at a Jesuit college there. He came to Paris in 1772, and wrote criticisms for the Mercure de France. He also composed a comic opera, Pomponin (1777). The Satire des satires (1778) and the Confession de Zulmé (1779) followed. The Confession was claimed by several different authors and was very successful.

Ginguené's defence of Niccola Piccinni against the partisans of Gluck made him more widely known. He hailed the first symptoms of the French Revolution, and joined Giuseppe Cerutti, the author of the Mémoire pour le peuple français (1788), and others in producing the Feuille villageoise, a weekly paper addressed to the villages of France. He also celebrated in an indifferent ode the opening of the states-general. In his Lettres sur les confessions de J.-J. Rousseau (1791), he defended the life and principles of his author.

He was imprisoned during the Reign of Terror and escaped with life only by the downfall of Maximilien Robespierre. After his release he assisted, as director-general of the "commission exécutive de l'instruction publique", in reorganizing the system of public instruction, and he was an original member of the Institute of France. In 1797, the Directory appointed him minister plenipotentiary to the king of Sardinia. After seven months, Ginguené retired to his country house of St Prix, in the valley of Montmorency. He was appointed a member of the tribunate, but Napoleon, finding that he was not sufficiently tractable, had him expelled at the first "purge", and Ginguené returned to his literary pursuits.

== Career ==
He was one of the commission appointed to continue the Histoire littéraire de la France, and he contributed to the volumes of this series which appeared in 1814, 1817 and 1820. Ginguené's most important work is the Histoire littéraire d'Italie (14 vols., 1811–1835). He was putting the finishing touches to the eighth and ninth volumes when he died. The last five volumes were written by Francesco Salfi and revised by Pierre Daunou.

In the composition of his history of Italian literature he was guided for the most part by the great work of Girolamo Tiraboschi, but he avoids the prejudices and party views of his model.

Ginguené edited the Décade philosophique, politique et littéraire until it was suppressed by Napoleon in 1807. He contributed largely to the Biographie universelle, the Mercure de France and the Encyclopidie méthodique; and he edited the works of Nicolas Chamfort and of Lebrun. Among his minor productions are an opera, Pomponin on le tuteur mystifié (1777); La Satire des satires (1778); De l'autorité de Rabelais dans la revolution présente (1791); De M. Neckar (1795); Fables nouvelles (1810); Fables inédites (1814).

== Legacy ==
Ginguené is buried in the Père-Lachaise cemetery in Paris.

The Rue Ginguené in Rennes is named after him.

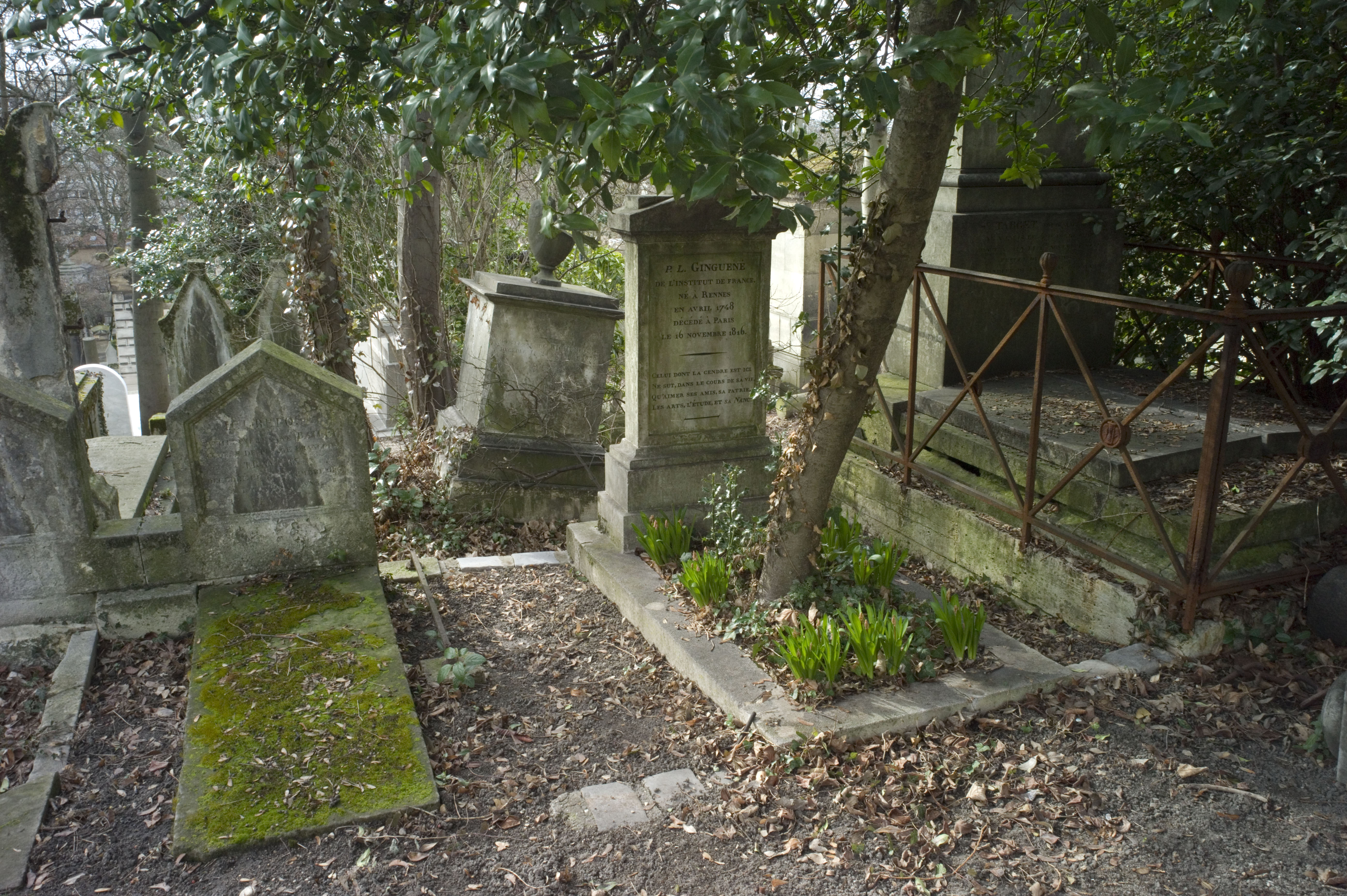
Guinguné's grave at Père Lachaise cemetery

== Works ==
- Pomponin, ou le tuteur mystifié, opéra bouffon en 2 actes, représenté au château de Fontainebleau en 1777
- La Satire des satires, 1778
- Épître au poète Le Brun pour l’engager à publier le recueil de ses poésies, avril 1785
- Éloge de Louis XII, Père du peuple, discours qui a concouru pour le prix de l’Académie française in 1788
- Ode sur les États généraux, 1789
- De l’Autorité de Rabelais dans la révolution présente et dans la constitution civile du clergé, ou institutions royales, politiques et ecclésiastiques, tirées de "Gargantua" et de "Pantagruel", 1791
- Lettres sur les Confessions de J.-J. Rousseau, 1791
- Tableaux de la Révolution française, ou Collection de quarante-huit gravures, représentant les événements principaux qui ont eu lieu en France depuis la transformation des États généraux en Assemblée nationale, le 20 juin 1789, en collaboration avec l’abbé Claude Fauchet, Chamfort et Pagès, 1791–1804
- De M. Necker, et de son livre intitulé : "De la révolution française", 1796
- Notice sur la vie et les ouvrages de Nicolas Piccinni, 1800
- Coup d’œil rapide sur le ″Génie du christianisme″, ou Quelques pages sur les cinq volumes in-8° publiés sous ce titre par François-Auguste Chateaubriand, 1802
- Lettres de P.-L. Ginguené, ... à un académicien de l’Académie impériale de Turin [l’abbé Valperga de Caluso] sur un passage de la vie de Vittorio Alfieri, 1809
- Fables nouvelles, 1810
- Histoire littéraire d’Italie, 1811
- Notice sur la vie et les ouvrages de M.-J. de Chénier, 1811
- Les Noces de Thétis et de Pélée, poème de Catulle, traduit en vers français, 1812

== See also ==
- Les Neuf Sœurs

== Bibliography ==
- Paolo Grossi, Pierre-Louis Ginguené, historien de la littérature italienne, Bern, Lang, 2006 (ISBN 9783039111503)
- Édouard Guitton, Ginguené : idéologue et médiateur, Rennes, Presses universitaires de Rennes, 1995 (ISBN 2868471579)
- Paul Hazard, Journal de Ginguené, 1807–1808, avec une étude, Paris, Hachette, 1910
- (in Italian) Cristina Trinchero, Pierre-Louis Ginguené (1748–1816) e l’identità nazionale italiana nel contesto culturale europeo, Roma, Bulzoni, 2004 (ISBN 9788883199950)
- Sergio Zoppi, P.-L. Ginguené journaliste et critique littéraire, Torino, G. Giappichelli, 1968
- "Eloge de Ginguené" by Dacier, in the Mémoires de l'institut, tom. vii.;
- "Discours" by M. Daunou, prefixed to the second ed. of the Hist. litt. d'Italie;
- Dominique Joseph Garat, Notice sur la vie et les ouvrages de PL Guingené, prefixed to a catalogue of his library (Paris, 18I7).
