= Pierre Jean Georges Cabanis =

French philosopher

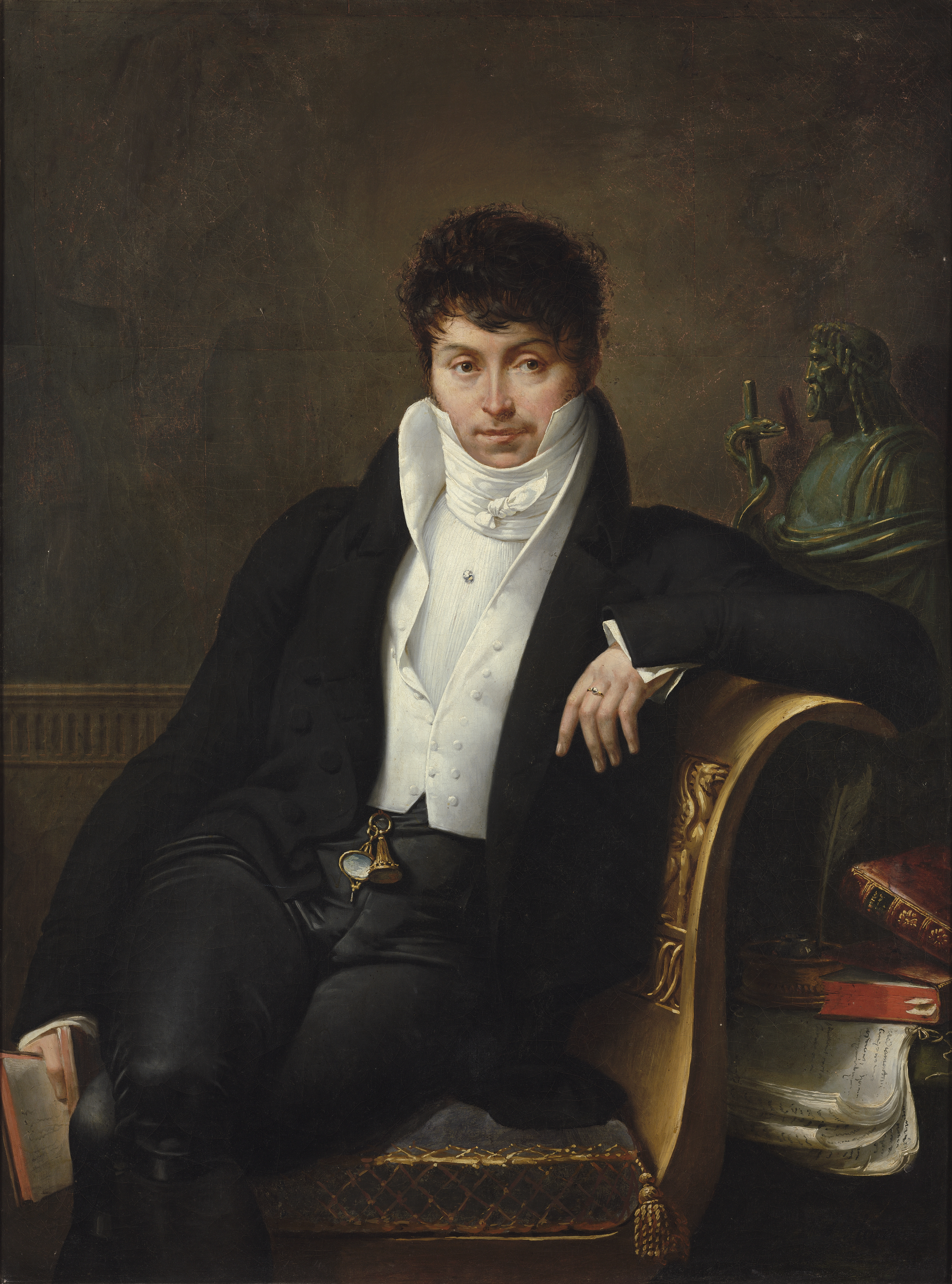
- Pierre Jean Georges Cabanis
- Born: 5 June 1757; Cosnac, Limousin, France
- Died: 5 May 1808 (aged 50); Seraincourt, Val-d'Oise, France
- Scientific career
- Fields: Physiology

Pierre Jean Georges Cabanis (French: [kabanis]; 5 June 1757 – 5 May 1808) was a French physiologist, Freemason, materialist philosopher and leading idéologue.

== Life ==
Cabanis was born at Cosnac (Limousin), the son of Jean Baptiste Cabanis (1723–1786), a lawyer and agronomist. At the age of ten, he attended the college of Brives, where he showed great aptitude for study, but his independence of spirit was so great that he was almost constantly in a state of rebellion against his teachers and was finally expelled. He was then taken to Paris by his father and left to carry on his studies at his own discretion for two years. From 1773 to 1775 he travelled in Poland and Germany, and on his return to Paris he devoted himself mainly to poetry. About this time he sent to the Académie française a translation of the passage from Homer proposed for their prize, and, though he did not win, he received so much encouragement from his friends that he contemplated translating the whole of the Iliad.

At his father's wish, he gave up writing and decided to engage in a more settled profession, selecting medicine. In 1789 his Observations sur les hôpitaux (Observations on hospitals, 1790) procured him an appointment as administrator of hospitals in Paris, and in 1795 he became professor of hygiene at the medical school of Paris, a post which he exchanged for the chair of legal medicine and the history of medicine in 1799.

Partly because of his poor health, he tended not to practise as a physician, his interests lying in the deeper problems of medical and physiological science. During the last two years of Honoré Mirabeau's life, Cabanis was intimately connected with him; Cabanis wrote the four papers on public education which were found among Mirabeau's papers at his death (and Cabanis edited them soon afterwards in 1791). During the illness which terminated his life Mirabeau trusted entirely to Cabanis' professional skills. Of the death of Mirabeau, Cabanis drew up a detailed narrative, intended as a justification of his treatment of the case. He was enthusiastic about the French Revolution and became a member of the Council of Five Hundred and then of the Senate, and the dissolution of the Directory was the result of a motion which he made to that effect. His political career was brief. Hostile to the policy of Napoleon Bonaparte, he rejected every offer of a place under his government. He died at Meulan.

His body is buried in the Pantheon and his heart in Auteuil Cemetery in Paris.

== Works ==
Cabanis was closely associated with the group of thinkers known as the idéologues, who were active during the French Revolutionary and early Napoleonic periods. Together with figures such as Antoine Destutt de Tracy, one of the leading theorist of the group, founder of idéologie and his close friend, Cabanis contributed to an intellectual project that aimed to ground the study of ideas in a systematic, scientific analysis of sensation and human faculties, closely linked to physiology and early psychology.

A complete edition of Cabanis's works was begun in 1825, and five volumes were published. His principal work, Rapports du physique et du moral de l'homme (On the relations between the physical and moral aspects of man, 1802), consists in part of memoirs, read in 1796 and 1797 to the institute, and is a sketch of physiological psychology. Psychology is with Cabanis directly linked on to biology, for sensibility, the fundamental fact, is the highest grade of life and the lowest of intelligence. All the intellectual processes are evolved from sensibility, and sensibility itself is a property of the nervous system. The soul is not an entity, but a faculty; thought is the function of the brain. Just as the stomach and intestines receive food and digest it, so the brain receives impressions, digests them, and has as its organic secretion, thought.

Alongside this materialism, Cabanis held another principle. He belonged in biology to the vitalistic school of G.E. Stahl, and in the posthumous work, Lettre sur les causes premières (1824), the consequences of this opinion became clear. Life is something added to the organism: over and above the universally diffused sensibility there is some living and productive power to which we give the name of Nature. It is impossible to avoid ascribing both intelligence and will to this power. This living power constitutes the ego, which is truly immaterial and immortal. Cabanis did not think that these results were out of harmony with his earlier theory.

His work was highly appreciated by the philosopher Arthur Schopenhauer, who called his work "excellent".

He was a member of the masonic lodge Les Neuf Sœurs from 1778. In 1786, Cabanis was elected an international member of the American Philosophical Society in Philadelphia.

== Evolution ==
Cabanis was an early proponent of evolution. In the Encyclopedia of Philosophy it is stated that he "believed in spontaneous generation. Species have evolved through chance mutations ("fortuitous changes") and planned mutation ("man's experimental attempts") which change the structures of heredity."

He influenced the work of Jean-Baptiste Lamarck, who referred to Cabanis in his Philosophie Zoologique. Cabanis was an advocate of the inheritance of acquired characteristics; he also developed his own theory of instinct.

Cabanis made a statement that recognized a basic understanding of natural selection. Historian Martin S. Staum has written that:

In a simple statement of adaptation and selection theory, Cabanis argued that species that have escaped extinction "have had successively to bend and conform to sequences of circumstances, from which apparently were born, in each particular circumstance, other entirely new species, better adjusted to the new order of things."
