= Les Rencontres Philosophiques de Monaco =

Monégasque philosophical organization

- Founded: 2015
- Founders: Charlotte Casiraghi, Robert Maggiori, Joseph Cohen, Raphael Zagury-Orly
- Purpose: Philosophy, contemporary cultural debate, education
- Location: Monaco
- Method: Lectures, symposiums, annual prizes, publishing
- Website: philomonaco.com

Les Rencontres Philosophiques de Monaco (The Philosophical Meetings of Monaco), also known as PhiloMonaco, is an intellectual symposium and cultural organization based in Monaco. Founded in 2015, the institution aims to make philosophy available to the general public while emphasizing "playful, joyful, and scholarly knowledge", by organizing workshops, open lectures, debates, dialogues, and cultural seminars that connect classical philosophy with contemporary societal issues.

The organisation's aim is to utilize philosophical methods across disciplines (including medicine, politics, psychoanalysis, literature, and the social sciences) in ways that are considered useful and accessible, (Note: Accessibility is stressed in promotional transmissions about PhiloMonaco. Example: Casiraghi's interview on Monaco Info Philomonaco : une semaine de philosophie pour tous," 28 May 2024, at 6:41 on the YouTube video.) and that enhance the culture of the Principality. Every year the events organized by PhiloMonaco are tied to a particular theme, such as love, the body, violence, and "what it means to be human." The organization also oversees the annual Prix PhiloMonaco awards, recognizing meaningful contributions to contemporary thought, by opening up "news ways of approaching and questioning the world."

== History ==
The organization was co-founded in 2015 by Charlotte Casiraghi (who serves as president), the French philosopher Robert Maggiori, (Note: Maggiori was Casiraghi's La Terminale teacher in the early 2000s at the Lycée François Couperin in Fontainebleau, France.) Canadian-French philosopher Joseph Cohen, and the French philosopher Raphael Zagury-Orly. Since 2024, Laura Hugo has been listed in press articles as director of the organization and one of the main spokespeople. The initial goal was to award an essay prize to a writer in the French-language philosophical landscape, however the project evolved into a more ambitious establishment in Monaco, positioning itself ostensibly as an international hub for contemporary philosophical engagement. Operating outside of (but in collaboration with) traditional academic institutions, the main objective of PhiloMonaco has been to make philosophy broadly accessible and culturally beneficial.

The dialogue between students and teachers is a key framework that runs through PhiloMonaco's core history and mission. Casiraghi was a student in Maggiori's philosophy class and as Laura Hugo has emphasized, the organization continues to operate along that fundamental Socratic model. From that core relationship grows an exchange and flow of ideas. In Casiraghi's words, the mission is to "share culture with a wider audience on a larger scale", so promoting the work of the scholars and making their contributions known to more people.

== Organization ==
PhiloMonaco is organized in partnership with the Prince's Government and the Department of Education, Youth, and Sport. It is also subsidized by luxury sponsorships like Montblanc and Chanel, (Note: Casiraghi is a high-profile ambassador for the fashion house of Chanel as well as a global brand ambassador for Montblanc.) as well as the Columbia Global Centers for international research.

Sometimes the media are partners with PhiloMonaco for events, as was the case between the organization and Madame Figaro (Le Figaro's magazine) for Semaine PhiloMonaco in 2024.

At the head of the PhiloMonaco team and its departments:

- President: Charlotte Casiraghi
- President of the Jury: Robert Maggiori
- Founding Member: Raphaël Zagury-Orly
- Honorary Founding Member: Joseph Cohen (Note: Cohen is listed as an "honorary founding member" on the official website, maintaining his connection with the organization while reducing his participation from what it was prior to about 2023/2024.)
- Director: Laura Hugo (Note: Laura Hugo was already PhiloMonaco’s director of editorial content and publication.)
- Secretary General: Vanina Mandelli
- Press officer: Élisabeth Trétiack-Franck

A jury, presided over by Maggiori, consists of "recognizable personalities" in the world of philosophy.

The jury members are:

- Robert Maggiori
- Isabelle Alfandary
- Étienne Bimbenet
- Charlotte Casiraghi
- Catherine Chalier
- Denis Kambouchner
- Sandra Laugier
- Claire Marin
- Géraldine Muhlmann
- Corine Pelluchon
- Judith Revel
- Camille Riquier
- Patrick Savidan
- Raphaël Zagury-Orly

Honorary committee members:

- S.A.R. La Princesse de Hanovre
- Valerio Adami
- Henri Atlan
- Remo Bodei†
- Albina du Boisrouvray
- Rémi Brague
- Jean-Claude Carrière†
- Hélène Cixous
- Boris Cyrulnik
- Souleymane Bachir Diagne
- Anne Dufourmantelle†
- Umberto Eco†
- Ágnes Heller†
- Julia Kristeva
- René Major
- Charles Malamoud
- Jean-Luc Marion
- Pierre Nora†
- Avital Ronell
- Fernando Savater
- John Scheid
- Amartya Sen
- Michel Serres†
- Gayatri Chakravorty Spivak

== Programs and activities ==
Events are held throughout the year, hosted by one or more of the founding members and honorary members, and organized around the chosen annual theme. Semaine PhiloMonaco (PhiloMonaco Week) occurs in June to promote public engagement directly by taking the conversation onto the streets, to workplaces, to schools, and third spaces. With its emphasis on public participation, Semaine PhiloMonaco aims to provide opportunities for meaningful questions and dialogue between the public, professionals (i.e. medical, media, business, and education) and visiting scholars.

PhiloMonaco holds monthly thematic public workshops (ateliers) throughout the academic year in Monaco. It hosts the annual PhiloMonaco week (in French: Semaine PhiloMonaco), which features panels, debates, and philosophical educational events co-organized across Monaco and Paris. Live events take place at event venues in the Principality of Monaco, most often at the Théâtre Princesse Grace, but sometimes at other places, like the Fort Antoine Theatre, the New National Museum of Monaco, the Yacht Club de Monaco, and the Oceanographic Museum of Monaco. Round table discussions, jury meetings, and prize ceremonies are often coordinated at La Maison de la Poésie, La Scala, or the Maison des Océans at the Institut océanographique in Paris.

== Media ==
The organization communicates with the public via major social media channels, such as Facebook, Instagram, Twitter, and YouTube. Broadly, the username for the organization is designated as @philomonaco. Recorded transmissions are published on Spotify, Apple Podcasts, Deezer, and Soundcloud. During the COVID-19 pandemic, social media became an essential tool of communication, with Maggiori, Zagury-Orly, and Cohen doing regular and alternating "#InstantPhilo" lectures using videoconferencing software. That period saw eleven episodes of Les Antivirus Philosophiques (antivirus series), each one hosted by a different scholar connected with the organization and transmitted via the normal social media channels and to the internal Princess Grace Hospital Centre network.

=== Publications ===
==== Les Ateliers (Workshops) ====
- L'amour (Love)
  - Authors: Paul Audi, Gérard Bensussan, Monique Canto-Sperber, Marc Crépon, Anne Dufourmantelle, Michel Erman, Cynthia Fleury, Christian Godin, Nicolas Grimaldi, Denis Kambouchner, Ruwen Ogien, Giulia Sissa, and Frédéric Worms
- L'humain (Humanity)
  - Authors: Étienne Bimbenet, Monique Canto-Sperber, Catherine Chalier, Alain Ehrenberg, Cynthia Fleury, Christian Godin, Bruno Karsenti, Philippe Lançon, Corine Pelluchon, Sabine Prokhoris, Judith Revel, and Francis Wolff
- La violence (Violence)
  - Authors: Hicham-Stéphane Afeissa, Mark Alizart, Anastasia Colosimo, Marc Crépon, Caroline Dayer, Geneviève Delaisi de Parseval, Jean-Pierre Dupuy, Markus Gabriel, Donatien Grau, Frédéric Gros, Philippe Grosos, Guillaume le Blanc, Simon Lemoine, Jean-Claude Monod, Jacques de Saint-Victor, and Céline Spector
- Le corps (Body):
  - Authors: Bernard Andrieu, Renaud Barbaras, Marie-Aude Baronian, Ali Benmakhlouf, Véronique Bergen, Jean-Michel Besnier, Anne Gotman, Xavier Guchet, Philippe Liotard, Claire Marin, Catherine Millet, Yves Panis, Corine Pelluchon, Sabine Prokhoris, Bertrand Quentin, Catherine Rioult, Georges Vigarello, and Frédéric Worms

==== Les Cahiers (Notebooks) ====
- Le Cahier no.1
- Le Cahier no.2
- Le Cahier no.3
- Le Cahier no.4
- Cahier du (dé)confinement. In partnership with the Prince Pierre Foundation.

==== Interview and conference transcripts (Entretien) ====
- L’Amour fou (mad or foolish love): clinical psychologist Sarah Chiche, writer Yannick Haenel, and writer Paul Audi
- Marcel Conche: « On a dû s’embrasser quelque peu… » ("We had to embrace a little bit")
- Marc Crépon: Verticalité du pouvoir et démocratie (Verticality of power and democracy)
- Boris Cyrulnik: Enfance et violence (Childhood and violence)
- Éric Fiat: La pudeur à l’épreuve du soin (Modesty put to the test by care)
- Julia Kristeva: L’érotisme maternel et son sens aujourd’hui (Maternal eroticism and its meaning today)
- Jean-Luc Marion: Philosopher entre théologie et ontologie (Philosopher between theology and ontology)
- Jean-Claude Milner: Le refus des idoles (The rejection of idols)
- Michel Serres: Le philosophe voyageur (The traveling philosopher)

==== Qu’est-ce que la philosophie? ("What is philosophy?" series) ====
This was a lecture series ultimately compiled in a work under the same title, co-directed by Raphaël Zagury-Orly with Isabelle Alfandary and Sandra Laugier and published by Librairie philosophique J. Vrin.

Contributors to this series include: Serge Audier, Étienne Bimbenet, Jean-Baptiste Brenet, Emanuele Coccia, Vincent Delecroix, Manon Garcia, and Marie Garrau.

=== Select bibliography ===
- Michel Blay. La communication et le parler à l'ère du numérique. Rencontres philosophiques de Monaco, 7 June 2017, Monaco]. ⟨hal-03724406⟩.
- Pierre-Antoine Chardel. Le temps file. Temps et accélération. Les Rencontres philosophiques de Monaco, 14 November 2019], Monaco. (hal-03121173⟩.
- Pierre-Antoine Chardel. Ethique de la parole vive et asymétrie de l’intersubjectivité. Les Rencontres philosophiques de Monaco. 29 November 2019, Paris. (hal-03121924).
- Julia Kristeva. "Le corps maternel." Les Rencontres philosophiques de Monaco, Friday, 27 avril 2017.
- Bertrand Quentin. « Le poumon, vous dis-je ! » ou les signaux faibles d’un faux positif, pp.83-90. Le Cahier du (dé)confinement, March-June 2020, Monaco, Les Rencontres Philosophiques de Monaco. ⟨hal-03195466⟩.

== Prizes and Awards ==
Each year during its June symposium, the organization presents its jury-selected awards, to honor contributions to French-language philosophical text and publishing, bridging theory and real-world applications to key issues.

=== Prix PhiloMonaco de l'Essai (The Essay Prize) ===
Awarded to a recent book that offers new perspectives on major contemporary issues while at the same time balancing academic standards with broad accessibility without oversimplifying.

==== Winners of the Essay Prize ====
2026

- Title: Une philosophie des sanglots
- Author: Estelle Ferrarese
- ISBN 9782743665548
- Publisher: Payot & Rivages
- Year of Publication: 2025

2025

- Title: Faire ensemble. Reconstruction sociale et sortie du capitalisme
- Author: Franck Fischbach
- ISBN 978-2-02-153262-3
- Publisher: Éditions du Seuil
- Year of Publication: 2024 [2, 7, 8, 9]

2024

- Title: Le Je et le Nous. Essai sur l'identité
- Author: Pierre Guenancia
- ISBN 9782204153027
- Publisher: Éditions du Cerf
- Year of Publication: 2023

2023

- Title: Que veut dire penser ? Arabes et Latins
- Author: Jean-Baptiste Brenet
- ISBN 9782743657413
- Publisher: Éditions Rivages
- Year of Publication: 2022

2022

- Title: La conversation des sexes : Philosophie du consentement
- Author: Manon Garcia
- ISBN 9782081519022
- Publisher: Éditions Flammarion / Climats
- Year of Publication: 2021

2021

- Title: La cité écologique. Pour un éco-républicanisme
- Author: Serge Audier
- ISBN 9782348059803
- Publisher: La Découverte
- Year of Publication: 2020

2020

- Title: Apprendre à perdre
- Author: Vincent Delecroix
- ISBN 9782743648114
- Publisher: Payot & Rivages
- Year of Publication: 2019

2019

- Title: Politiques de la vulnérabilité
- Author: Marie Garrau
- ISBN 9782271116666
- Publisher: CNRS Éditions
- Year of Publication: 2018

2018

- Title: Le Complexe des trois singes. Essai sur l'animalité humaine
- Author: Étienne Bimbenet
- ISBN 9782021370218
- Publisher: Éditions du Seuil
- Year of Publication: 2017

2017

- Title: La Vie des plantes. Une métaphysique du mélange
- Author: Emanuele Coccia
- ISBN 9782330076214
- Publisher: Payot & Rivages
- Year of Publication: 2016

2016

- Title: Au bonheur des morts. Récits de ceux qui restent
- Author: Vinciane Despret
- ISBN 9782348043659
- Publisher: La Découverte
- Year of Publication: 2015

=== Prix PhiloMonaco de l'Éditeur (The Publisher's Prize) ===
Honors a French-language publishing house that has distinguished itself through the circulation of philosophical thought and the encouragement of new authors and ideas. A selection of works from the winning publisher is then donated to Monaco's Médiathèque Caroline ("Caroline Media Library") as a part of the prize's goal toward the dissemination of knowledge. From 2016 to 2024, the award was designated as a La Mention Honorifique.

==== List of winners ====
- Éditions Jérôme Millon: Winner in 2026.
- CNRS Éditions: Winner in 2025.
- Éditions Érès: Winner in 2024.
- Collection NRF-Essais, Éditions Gallimard: Winner in 2023. This collection was founded and directed by Éric Vigne.
- La Découverte: Winner in 2022.
- Collection Petite Bibliothèque Rivages, Payot & Rivages: Winner in 2021.
- Éditions Galilée: Winner in 2020.
- Les Belles Lettres: Winner in 2019.
- Collection GF Corpus / Philosophie, Éditions Flammarion: Winner in 2018.
- Éditions de l'éclat: Winner in 2017.
- Librairie philosophique J. Vrin: Winner in 2016.

=== Prix de la Principauté (The Principality Prize) ===
The Prix de la Principauté (Principality Prize) has been awarded to major global figures (for notable contributions across disciplines and for an entire body of work) since 2017. It is a lifetime achievement award presented jointly with the Prince Pierre Foundation to a person of global renown for their lifelong body of work in recognition of advancement of philosophical thought through interdisciplinary approaches.

==== Laureates of the Principality Prize ====
- 2026: Martha Nussbaum
- 2025: Siri Hustvedt
- 2024: Souleymane Bachir Diagne
- 2023: Jacques Rancière
- 2022: Philippe Descola
- 2021: Julia Kristeva
- 2020: Hélène Cixous
- 2019: Georges Didi-Huberman
- 2018: Jean-Luc Marion
- 2017: Jean-Claude Milner

=== Le Prix Lycéen (The High School Prize) ===
Organized in partnership with Monaco's Ministry of Education, Youth, and Sports, this award is given to two students for essays on a chosen philosophical prompt. This is part of the organization's expansive youth program.

== See also ==
- New Philosophers
- List of French philosophers
- List of Italian philosophers
- Collège international de philosophie: Seminars, periodicals, communications in philosophy based in Paris
- Institut Universitaire de France: France-wide academic community that recognizes higher education achievement and assists research
- Collège de France: Prestigious research institute founded in 1530 by King François
- Académie Française: Learned and prestigious society established in 1635 by Cardinal Richelieu
- Grand prix de philosophie (philosophy awards)
- Les Rendez-vous littéraires rue Cambon: Chanel-sponsored podcast for discussions of literature
- Médiathèque Caroline (Caroline Media Library, Monaco)
- Louis Notari Library (Monaco's national state library)
- Princess Grace Irish Library, Monaco
