= Camille Riquier =

French philosopher, scholar of French philosophy

- Born: May 7, 1974 (age 52)
- Awards: Prix La Bruyère (2010)

Education
- Education: Paris-Sorbonne University
- Thesis: Temps et méthode chez Bergson (2007)
- Doctoral advisor: Jean-Luc Marion

Philosophical work
- Era: Contemporary philosophy
- Region: Western philosophy
- School: Continental philosophy
- Institutions: Institut Catholique de Paris (professor); PhiloMonaco (jury member)
- Main interests: History of philosophy

Camille Riquier (French: [kamij ʁikje]; born 7 May 1974) is a French philosopher and professor at the Catholic University of Paris. He is also a jury member for Les Rencontres Philosophiques de Monaco. In 2010, he won the Prix La Bruyère, awarded by the French Academy for his work Archéologie de Bergson.

== Background ==
Riquier obtained the agregation in philosophy in 2000. He completed his doctoral thesis, Temps et méthode chez Bergson, in 2007 at Paris-Sorbonne University (Paris 4) under the direction of Jean-Luc Marion. He then became a professor at the Catholic University of Paris. He obtained hos habilitation to direct research at Panthéon-Sorbonne University (Paris 1) in 2018.

== Career ==
He is a member of the editorial team at Esprit, a French literary magazine. He is also a member of the editorial committee for the revue Alter and for Philosophie magazine.

In 2010, he awarded the Prix La Bruyère by the French Academy for his work, Archéologie de Bergson.

In 2019, he wrote the obituary for Jean-Louis Chrétien for Libération magazine.

He is a specialist on the works of Henri Bergson and also writes about Péguy and Sartre. He is coeditor of Annales bergsoniennes. His work in philosophy emphasizes the idea, the methods, and the meaning of belief.

In 2020, he published Nous ne savons plus croire, revised with a new postface in 2023.

He is also on the jury for the annual prizes presented by Les Rencontres Philosophiques de Monaco ("Philomonaco") for philosophical contributions in writing and publishing.

== Reception ==
His book Métamorphose de Descartes. Le secret de Sartre (Gallimard, 2022) was reviewed by Éric Pommier for Cités (revue). Praising the writing for clarity and elegance, Pommier calls it a work that continues a job begun in recent years by contemporary philosophers-that is, the re-reading of Sartre through a lens different than through Heidegger's analysis. Riquier, therefore, set out to understand Sartre on his own terms. Riquier's hypothesis, Pommier writes, was to supersede Descartes. Far from an incredible reach into psychoanalysis, Pommier argues that Riquier's approach may provide exactly the hermeneutic key to understanding the existentialist, as it detangles Sartre's thought from the phenomenology of Heidegger and Husserl. Pommier thus suggests that Riquier's interpretation is more realist and that, likewise, his emphasis on the text rather than the myth of Descartes, as it influenced Sartre, serves the same purpose.

== Publications ==
- Preface, Matière et mémoire (PUF, 2012) by Henri Bergson, ISBN 9782130608233
- Philosophie de Péguy, ou, les mémoires d'un imbécile, PUF: 2017, 552p, ISBN 9782130630678.
- Nous ne savons plus croire, Éditions Desclée de Brouwer: 2020, 244p, ISBN 9782220096605.
  - Revision: PUF, collection « Quadrige », format Kindle, 2023, 217p.
- Archéologie de Bergson : Temps et métaphysique, PUF: 2021, 564p. ISBN 9782130833086.
- Métamorphoses de Descartes: Le secret de Sartre, Gallimard: 2022, 336p. ISBN 9782072900327.
- Est-ce que tu sais ou est-ce que tu crois?, Gallimard jeune (collection Philophile, directed by Claire Marin), 2022, 48p. Drawings by Quentin Duckit. ISBN 9782075156813.
