= Renaud Barbaras =

French contemporary philosopher (born 1955)

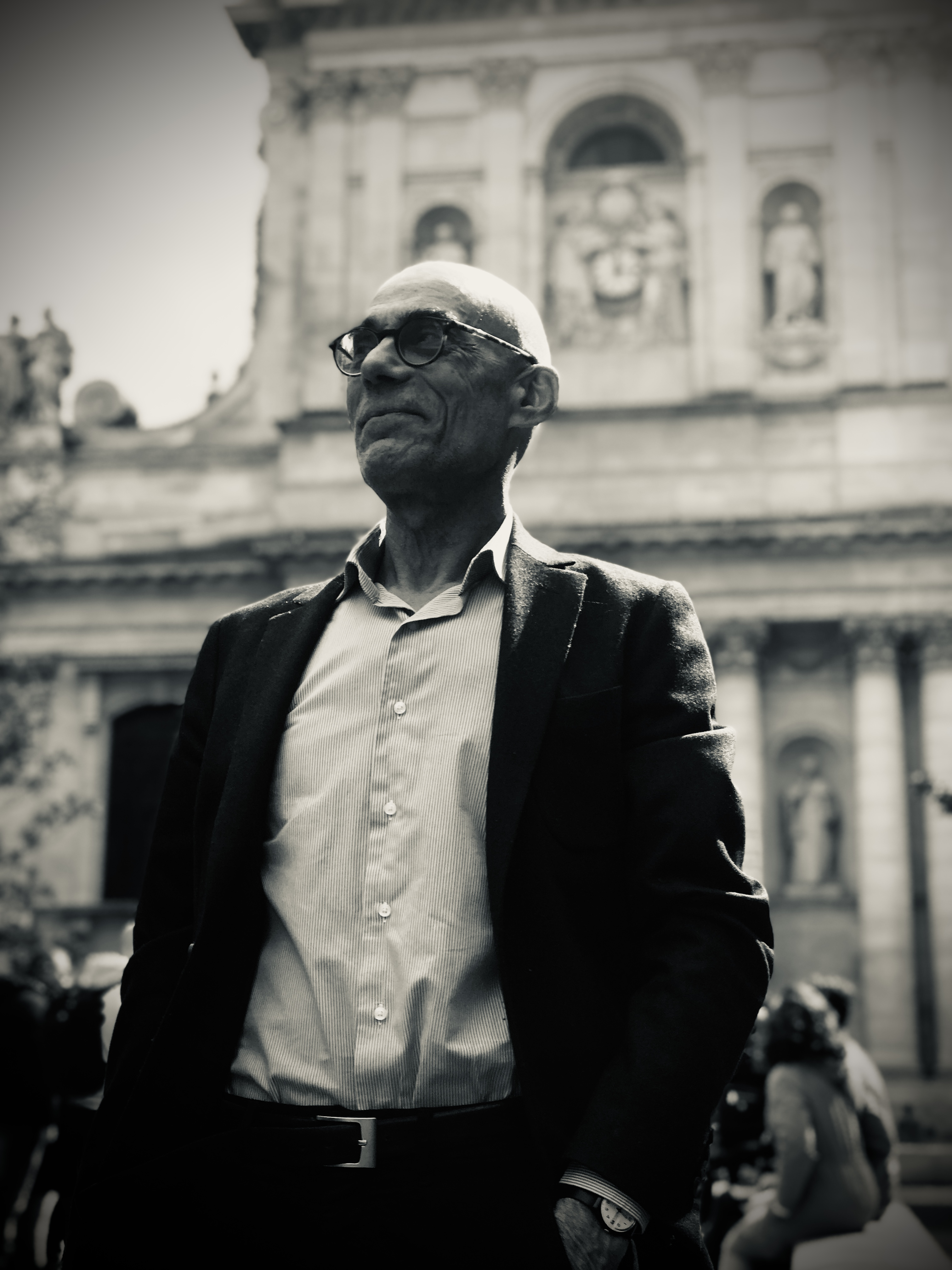
- Born: August 27, 1955 (age 71); Paris, France

Education
- Education: École normale supérieure de lettres et sciences humaines
- Thesis: The ontology of merleau-ponty (1990)
- Doctoral advisor: Bernard Bourgeois

Philosophical work
- Era: Contemporary
- Region: Western Philosophy
- School: Phenomenology
- Institutions: University of Paris 1 Pantheon-Sorbonne; Institut Universitaire de France; PhiloMonaco
- Notable students: Étienne Bimbenet
- Language: French
- Main interests: Philosophy of life, anthropology, psychoanalysis, metaphysics, perception
- Notable works: The Being of the Phenomenon: Merleau-Ponty's Ontology (2004)
- Notable ideas: Desire and Distance, Phenomenology of Perception

Renaud Barbaras (born 27 August 1955) is a French contemporary philosopher. An École normale supérieure de Saint-Cloud alumnus, he is Chair of Contemporary Philosophy and professor emeritus at the University of Paris 1 Pantheon-Sorbonne. He is most notable for his thoughts on Maurice Merleau-Ponty and Jan Patočka across multiple works.

== Biography ==
A former student of École normale supérieure de lettres et sciences humaines, with an Agrégation in philosophy (1979), he taught for about ten years in secondary education before defending his doctoral thesis in 1990, in homage to Merleau-Ponty, and under the supervision of Bernard Bourgeois.

From 2012-2014, he was president of the jury for the Agrégation. After earning his doctorate in 1990, he joined the faculty at Paris 1 Panthéon-Sorbonne University where he has been teaching since 1991.

Since 2023, he has been director of the poetry collection, Quelque part, nulle part.

He is a member of the editorial board for the journal Alter and co-director of the journal Chiasmi International.

== Awards, distinctions, and activities ==
He is an honorary Member of the Institut Universitaire de France and a member of the Scientific Council, Center for Philosophy at the University of Lisbon.

In 2014, Renaud Barbaras received the Grand prix de philosophie from l'Académie française, for the entire body of his work.

In 2016, he acted as a member of the jury for the annual prizes awarded by Les Rencontres Philosophiques de Monaco, and in 2017 he was in Monaco again for a "rencontre" (interview, meeting) for a workshop and discussion of "Le corps émoi" (Note: Vrin, the publishing company that compiles many PhiloMonaco events in book form, published Le corps en émoi in 2022, drawing on the works of Barbaras, Merleau-Ponty, Patočka, and others. ISBN 9782493296047. 300p.) (the body in turmoil) along with philosophers Bernard Andrieu and Corine Pelluchon.

In 2017, he received Prix Mercier for his work « Métaphysique du sentiment. »

In 2019, he was the laureate of la Chaire Mercier of the Catholic University of Louvain (in Louvain-la-Neuve) where he delivered the lecture that was later published in his book L'Appartenance.

In 2024, he achieved the Chaire Étienne Gilson at the Catholic University of Paris.

== Research ==
In 1999, Barbaras built his philosophy in confrontation with the aporias of the philosophy of the late Maurice Merleau-Ponty, the philosopher his thesis in 1990 paid homage to. He was drawn to the works of both Merleau-Ponty and of Jan Patočka.

In Desire and distance, Barbaras addresses the consequences of the Abschattung (Abschattung) theory (Note: Theory of shadowing, or shading postulated by Husserl that while we can't see all the sides of an object, we have awareness of its spacial nature. See Logische Untersuchungen, Husserl's text, and also Sartre's Being and Nothingness.) that neither Edmund Husserl nor Merleau-Ponty managed to clarify: his idea is to be faithful to the principle according to which the fact that we only perceive one side of the things around us doesn't mean we don't perceive them as themselves. (Note: Desire and distance, Introduction: The problem of perception) This is what he calls not submitting perception to the law of object (or objectivity): the mistake he spots is the prejudice we have in our way of perceiving as imperfect in comparison with the supposed plenitude of the things themselves. (Note: Desire and distance, Chapter 2: Critique of transcendantal phenomenology) But to be consequential would be to acknowledge the fact that nothing can appear if not to a subject. This doesn't mean that the subject is constituting the object, but merely that he is a part of the process of manifestation. (Note: Desire and distance, Chapter 3: The three moments of manifestation) To be a part of and not to be constituting: this requires a new definition of subjectivity, which Barbaras tries to give through the conception of a subject based on the natural movement and what he calls desire: (Note: Desire and distance, Chapter 5: Desire as essence of subjectivity)

"We began our inquiry on the being of the intramondaneous (Note: intramondaneous (or intramondane or innerworldly) refers to something that occurs or is situated in the physical world, universe, or a specific system.) subject with the relation, phenomenologically attested, between perception and movement. Now, this relation no longer represents any difficulty. It is plainly justified by the fact desire consists in experiencing its own limits. Indeed, since perception is only possible through the limitation of a totality, every perception essentially calls for its overtaking by a movement. Perceiving, in the end, is always passing to something else. And this doesn't only mean that a perception may give way to another perception, but that perception consists in giving way to something else because, since perception is desire, a reality is only to be grasped as something essentially missing." (Note: Le désir et la distance (1999), Vrin, p. 151.)

== French bibliography ==
- De l'être du phénomène. Sur l'ontologie de Merleau-Ponty, Grenoble: Éditions Jérôme Millon, « Krisis », 1991.

English translation by Ted Toadvine and Leonard Lawlor, The Being of the Phenomenon: Merleau-Ponty's Ontology, Indiana University Press, 2004.

- La Perception. Essai sur le sensible, Paris, Hatier, « Optiques, Philosophie », 1994. Rééd. Paris, Vrin, 2009.
- Merleau-Ponty, Paris, Ellipses, « Philo-Philosophes », 1997.
- Le tournant de l'expérience. Recherches sur la philosophie de Merleau-Ponty, Paris, Vrin, « Histoire de la philosophie », 1998.
- Le désir et la distance. Introduction à une phénoménologie de la perception, Paris, Librairie philosophique J. Vrin, « Problèmes et controverses », 1999.

English translation by Paul B. Milan, Desire and Distance: Introduction to a Phenomenology of Perception, Stanford University Press, 2005.

- Vie et intentionnalité. Recherches phénoménologiques, Paris, Librairie philosophique J. Vrin, 2003.
- Introduction à la philosophie de Husserl, Éditions de la Transparnce, 2004.
- Le mouvement de l'existence. Études sur la phénoménologie de Jan Patočka, Éditions de la Transparence, 2007.
- L'ouverture du monde: Lecture de Jan Patočka, Editions de la Transparence, 25 août 2011.
- La vie lacunaire, Paris, Vrin, 19 septembre 2011.
- Expérience du rêve d'Anna Glazova par Renaud Barbaras, les parutions Sitaudis. 18 March 2016.
- "Le corps émoi". Les Ateliers / Le corps. p. 209. Les Rencontres Philosophiques de Monaco.
- L'appartenance. Vers une cosmologie phénoménologique, Leuven, Peeters, 2019.
- Introduction à une phénoménologie de la vie, Paris, Vrin, 2008. English translation by Leonard Lawlor as Introduction to a Phenomenology of Life forthcoming with Indiana University Press, 2022.
- Phénoménologie et cosmologie, Paris, éditions Librairie philosophique J. Vrin, 2024.

=== English translated bibliography ===
- Introduction to a Phenomenology of Life. Translation by Leonard Lawlor. Bloomington: Indiana University Press, 2022.
- The Phenomenology of Life: Desire as the Being of the Subject. The Oxford Handbook of Contemporary Phenomenology. 2012.
- Desire and Distance: Introduction to a Phenomenology of Perception. Stanford University Press. 192p. ISBN 9780804746458.
- "The being of the phenomenon : Merleau-Ponty's ontology." Loan copy from the Internet Archive. 2004. Translated by Ted Toadvine and Leonard Lawlor. ISBN 9780253216458.
- Affectivity and Movement: The Sense of Sensing in Erwin Straus. Phenomenology and the Cognitive Sciences 3 (2):215-228. 2004.
- Francisco Varela: A New Idea of Perception and Life. Phenomenology and the Cognitive Sciences 1 (2):127-132. 2002.

=== Co-authored works (in English) ===
- with Jane Marie Todd, and Emmanuel Alloa. Resistance of the Sensible World: An Introduction to Merleau-Ponty. New York: Fordham University Press, 2017.
- with Ben Garceau. "On Nature." The Yearbook of Comparative Literature 58 (2012): 122-130.
- with Jen McWeeny. Life, Movement, and Desire. Research in Phenomenology 38 (1):3-17. 2008.
- with Paul Milan. “Merleau-Ponty and Nature.” Research in Phenomenology 31 (2001): 22–38.

== Prefaces and postfaces ==
- Duicu, Dragos. Phénoménologie du mouvement: Patočka et l'héritage de la physique aristotélicienne. France: Hermann, 2014. Postface by Renaud Barbaras.

== See also ==
- Étienne Bimbenet (Doctoral student of Barbaras)
- Jean-Luc Marion (related work in phenomenology)
