= Éric Vigne =

Éric Vigne is a French writer and editor for Éditions Gallimard, where he founded the collection NRF Essais. He is known as a historiographical critic.

In 2023, the Collection NRF-Essais at Éditions Gallimard was awarded the Mention Honorifique (publisher's prize) from Les Rencontres Philosophiques de Monaco

== Works ==
- Le livre et l'éditeur, 2008
