= Judith Revel =

French philosopher and translator (born 1966)

- Born: 1966 (age 59–60)
- Occupations: Philosopher and translator

Education
- Education: ENS LSH; EHESS
- Thesis: Difference and discontinuity in Michel Foucault's thought : language, history, subjectivity (2005)
- Doctoral advisor: Marcel Gauchet

Philosophical work
- Era: Contemporary philosophy
- Region: Western philosophy
- Institutions: Paris 1 Professor (2023-); Paris X Professor (2014-23); PhiloMonaco, Jury member; IUF, Member

Judith Revel (born 1966) is a French philosopher and translator.

== Background, education, and career ==
Daughter of the historian and former president of the School for Advanced Studies in the Social Sciences (known as EHESS) Jacques Revel; former student of the École normale supérieure de Fontenay-Saint-Cloud (Agrégation, 1990), Judith Revel is a specialist in contemporary French and Italian thought.

After a first PhD obtained in Italy, in 2005 she completed a doctoral thesis at EHESS, in Philosophy under the direction of Marcel Gauchet. She was a lecturer at the Université Paris 1 Panthéon-Sorbonne, then Professor of Political Philosophy at the University Paris-Nanterre between 2014 and 2023 and member of the research team Sophiapol (Sociologie, philosophie, anthropologie politiques). Since 2023, she is Professor of French Contemporary Philosophy at the Université Paris 1 Panthéon-Sorbonne, and member of the Institut Universitaire de France.

She is member of the Michel Foucault Center. She presided over the scientific committee of the Collège international de philosophie (2013-2014). Since 2022, she presides over the scientific council of IMEC. She is also a member of the jury deciding the annual prizes presented by Les Rencontres Philosophiques de Monaco.

She was married to Antonio Negri, the Italian philosopher, until his death in December 2023.

== Work ==
The point of departure for Revel's research was the work of Michel Foucault, to whose study she has devoted a dictionary, several books and many articles, especially around two themes - the relationship between philosophy of language and literature (developed by Foucault in the 1960s), Foucault's opposition to idealism, and the transition from biopolitics to subjectivation (developed by Foucault between the late 1970s and the early 1980s). She is linked to the work of the American philosopher Arnold Davidson, with whom she has in common an attempt to update the ethico-political Foucaldian themes.

After the 2005 French riots, she wrote a book about the so-called "banlieues" ('suburbs' in French) criticizing both the clichés that surround their inhabitants and the growth of racism in French society. She analysed the refusal to give any political value to what was happening in the suburbs by deconstructing racist implicit images of public speeches (the roots of it might be the conviction that the one who does not speak the language of political representation is necessarily aphasic, childish or even animal).

Since the beginning of 2010, she has been working more generally on the philosophy of history, and especially the way in which a certain practice of philosophy has problematized both its own historical situation and the possibility of intervening in the present. In this context, she develops a work on the philosophical use of archives, especially through teachings and seminars at the EHESS. More generally, she studied the different representations of history in French thought since the 1950s.

It also extends its investigation of some Italian readings of French poststructuralism (Italian opera and post-opera, the thinking of Giorgio Agamben and Roberto Esposito). Finally, she develops a series of theses on the political theorizations before and after 1968 and on the necessary recasting of the political concepts of modernity, in the fermenting movement of Italian operaism and more particularly in the analyzes of her husband, the philosopher Toni Negri. She works in particular on the notion of "common" as an alternative to the public / private dichotomy, and on a political ontology of the present building bridges between Maurice Merleau-Ponty and Michel Foucault.

== Bibliography ==
=== Books ===
- Michel Foucault, expériences de la pensée, Bordas, 2005 ISBN 978-2047299449
- Dictionnaire Foucault, Ellipses, 2007 ISBN 978-2729841799
- Qui a peur de la banlieue?, Bayard jeunesse, 2008 ISBN 978-2227477575
- Le vocabulaire de Foucault, Ellipses, 2009 ISBN 9782729841799
- Foucault, une pensée du discontinu, Fayard/Mille et une nuits, 2010 ISBN 978-2755501452
- Dictionnaire politique à l'usage des gouvernés, Bayard Presse, 2012. ISBN 2227482699
- Un malentendu philosophique. Foucault, Derrida et l'affaire Descartes, Bayard Culture, 2015 ISBN 978-2227487185
- Foucault avec Merleau-Ponty. Ontologie politique, présentisme et histoire, Vrin, 2015. ISBN 9782711626250
- Foucault(s), authored with Jean-François Braunstein, Daniele Lorenzini, Ariane Revel, and Ariana Sforzini. Éditions de la Sorbonne, 2017. ISBN 9791035100278
- Merleau-Ponty à l’âge de l’anthropocène. (2025). Esprit, https://shs.cairn.info/revue-esprit-2025-3?lang=fr. Co-written with Corine Pelluchon and Étienne Bimbenet for Revue Esprit. Kindle edition: ISBN 9782372343282

=== Articles ===
- "The materiality of the immaterial: Foucault, against the return of idealisms and new vitalisms", Radical Philosophy 149 (May/June 2008)
- "Constituting New Modes of Thought and Life: On the Late Foucault", South Atlantic Quarterly (2022) 121 (4): 735–753. https://doi.org/10.1215/00382876-10066428
- "Résistance et Subjectivation : du « je » au « nous »", chapter in La pensée politique de Foucault, pp. 29 à, (2017).
- Lefort/Dante: Reading, Misreading, Transforming, in Dante's Modernity: An Introduction to the 'Monarchia'. With an essay by Judith Revel, ed. by Christiane Frey, Manuele Gragnolati, Christoph F. E. Holzhey, and Arnd Wedemeyer, trans. by Jennifer Rushworth, Cultural Inquiry, 16 (Berlin: ICI Berlin Press, 2020), pp. 87–108
- "'What Are We At the Present Time?' Foucault and the Question of the Present, Fuggle, S., Lanci, Y., Tazzioli, M. (eds), Foucault and the History of Our Present. Palgrave Macmillan, London. https://doi.org/10.1057/9781137385925_2
- "Identity, Nature, Life: Three Biopolitical Deconstructions", in Vanessa Lemm and Miguel Vatter (eds), The Government of Life Foucault, Biopolitics, and Neoliberalism, Fordham University Press, 2014.
