= Pierre Guenancia =

French philosopher

- Born: April 12, 1949 (age 77)
- Occupations: Philosopher, professor, writer
- Awards: Essay prize from PhiloMonaco, 2024

Education
- Education: École normale supérieure de Saint-Cloud
- Thesis: Inquiries on Problems of Meaning and the Foundation of Objectivity in Philosophies of Consciousness: : Descartes and the Understanding of Sensitive (1997)
- Doctoral advisor: Jean-Luc Marion
- Other advisor: Jean-Toussaint Desanti

Philosophical work
- Era: Contemporary Philosophy
- Region: Western Philosophy
- Institutions: Lycée Carnot; University of Burgundy Europe
- Main interests: History of philosophy, Italian philosophy, moral philosophy, political science, public philosophy
- Notable works: Du vide à Dieu: Essai sur la physique de Pascal; Le Je et le Nous. Essai sur l'identité

Pierre Guenancia, born on 12 April 1949, is a French philosopher, specializing on the thought of René Descartes. He is affiliated with the University of Burgundy Europe. In 2024, his book Le Je et le Nous. Essai sur l'identité won the essay prize given by Les Rencontres Philosophiques de Monaco.

== Biography ==
=== Education and early career ===
He studied at the École normale supérieure de Saint-Cloud (promotion 1970), obtaining the agregation in philosophy. At ENS, he was a student of Jean-Toussaint Desanti. In 1976, he published a book, Du vide à Dieu: Essai sur la physique de Pascal (Ed. François Maspero), about Pascalian physics. At Paris-Sorbonne University (Paris IV) he did a thesis for a doctorate (an inquiry into the problems of meaning and foundations of objectivity in the philosophies of consciousness relating to Descartes and sensitive intelligence) in 1997 under the direction of Jean-Luc Marion.

After a long assignment as a teacher in the classes préparatoires (littéraires) at Lycée Carnot, he joined the department of philosophy at the University of Burgundy Europe, where he was named a professor in 2001.

En 1984, he co-founded (with Didier Franck) the revue Philosophie, published by Les Éditions de Minuit.

=== Reform of philosophy curriculum for classe terminale ===
Starting in May 2018, he and Frank Burbage, Dean of the General Inspectorate for Philosophy, co-led the expert group tasked by the Higher Council for Curricula (CSP) with drafting the new philosophy curricula for the final year of secondary school. A draft curriculum, presented informally on 20 March 2019, removed the following concepts: consciousness, the unconscious, perception, the Other, work, reality, demonstration, interpretation, the living, matter and mind, law, exchange, duty, and happiness. Conversely, the proposal introduced the study of metaphysics, "the idea of God," and responsibility. This draft was rejected by the CSP, which drew up its own curriculum—one that notably included concepts that had previously been removed. Pierre Guénancia publicly deplores this repudiation and regrets the inclusion of authors and the excessive number of concepts, leaving everyone to associate them haphazardly and in any which way.

== Selected works ==
- Du vide à Dieu. Essai sur la physique de Pascal, collection « Algorithme », Éditions François Maspéro, Paris, 1976.
- Descartes et l'ordre politique. Critique cartésienne de l'ordre politique, collection « Philosophie d'aujourd'hui », Presses universitaires de France, Paris, 1983 ; nouvelle édition, collection « Tel », Gallimard, 2012.
- Descartes: Bien conduire sa raison, collection: Littératures, Paris: Éditions Gallimard, 1996. 128p.
- L'Intelligence du sensible. Essai sur le dualisme cartésien, collection « NRF Essais », Gallimard, Paris, 1998.
- Lire Descartes, collection « Folio », Gallimard, Paris, 2000.
- Le Regard de la pensée. Philosophie de la représentation, collection « Fondements de la politique », Presses universitaires de France, Paris, 2009.
- Descartes, chemin faisant, collection « Encre marine », Les Belles Lettres, Paris, 2010.
- Divertissements pascaliens, Hermann, Paris, 2011.
- Liberté cartésienne et découverte de soi, collection « Encre marine », Les Belles Lettres, Paris, 2013.
- La Voie des idées. De Descartes à Hume, collection « Une histoire personnelle de la philosophie », Presses universitaires de France, Paris, 2015.
- La Voie de la conscience : Husserl, Sartre, Merleau-Ponty, Ricœur , collection « Une histoire personnelle de la philosophie », Presses universitaires de France, Paris, 2018.
