= Éditions Jérôme Millon =

French publishing house

- Founded: 1985
- Founders: Jérôme Millon
- Country of origin: France
- Headquarters location: 3, place Vaucanson, 38000, Grenoble
- Distribution: Distique (1985-1992); PUF (1995-2000); Harmonia Mundi (France & Belgium); Dimédia (Canada); Servidis (Switzerland)
- Nonfiction topics: Philosophy, history, religion, prehistory, witchcraft, Jansenism
- Fiction genres: Literature
- Official website: https://www.millon.fr

Éditions Jérôme Millon is an independent French publishing house, founded in 1985 by Jérôme Millon, and specializing on works of philosophy, religion, history, and prehistory. Its headquarters is located in Grenoble.

== History, mission, and work ==
The publishing house is directed by Marie-Claude Carrara and Jérôme Millon.

In 2005, they were reported to have 300 titles. In 2017 that number rose to 400.

Éditions Jérôme Millon does not publish more than ten books a year. They have published several hundreds of rare texts from the Middle Ages on spirituality and witchcraft, as well as Jansenism and, in the words of literary critic and philosopher Robert Maggiori in 2005, writing for Libération, topics both real and mythological that traverse the ancient and medieval times, the time of the Inquisition and more:

"Autour du gâteau d'anniversaire de leurs vingt ans, il y aura, bien entendu, des philosophes et des hystériques, des vampires et des inquisiteurs, des devins grecs et des fous littéraires, des abbés lubriques, des saintes mystiques et des farfadets." [Gathered around the birthday cake marking their twentieth anniversary, there will, of course, be philosophers and hysterics, vampires and inquisitors, Greek soothsayers and literary madmen, lecherous abbés, mystical saints, and mischievous sprites.]

== Distinctions ==
It won the publisher's prize awarded annually by Les Rencontres Philosophiques de Monaco in 2026. The jury who awarded the prize considered that the Éditions Jérôme Millon is remarkable in its offerings as they "explore the structure of thought and the questions of our time."

== Collections ==
Krisis

- Directed by Marc Richir
- Features original philosophical texts (including contemporary philosophy) as well as critical or historical studies, that shed new light on enigmatic thoughts and ideas.
- In the collection: Étienne Bonnot de Condillac, Edmund Husserl, Eugen Fink, Jan Patočka, Gilbert Simondon, Ludwig Binswanger, Renaud Barbaras, Jean-Baptiste Brenet

Atopia

- Directed by Claude Louis-Combet
- Publishes spiritual literature from the Middle Ages to the 19th century, works of Christian inspiration ranging from traditional orthodox to marginal, heretical, and dissenting voices.
- In the Collection: Hildegard of Bingen, Petrarch, Jeanne Guyon, Joseph Antoine Toussaint Dinouart, Jeanne des Anges

Golgotha

- Directed by François Angelier
- Publishes texts by Catholic writers from the 19th century to the 20th century
- In the Collection: Joris-Karl Huysmans, Léon Bloy, François-André-Adrien Pluquet

Nomina

- Directed by Christophe Carraud
- Brings to light seminal texts from the tradition of reading
- In the Collection: Dante Alighieri, María Zambrano

Horos

- Directed by Marie-Laurence Desclos
- Publishes work on Ancient Greece and Ancient Rome

Mémoires du corps

- Directed by Jean-Jacques Courtine
- Explores the body, from antiquity to contemporary thought, to map its territories and trace the genealogy of its various states

Asclepios

- Directed by Serge Margel and Eva Yampolsky
- Publishes rare texts, by philosophers, physicians, and religious figures who have left their mark on history

L’homme des origines

- Directed by Marc Groenen
- Publishes works by prehistorians, i.e. André Leroi-Gourhan, Jean Clottes

== See also ==
- Manuscripts
- Sprite (folklore)
- Mysticism
