= Serge Audier =

French political and environmental philosopher

- Occupation: Philosopher
- Awards: Prix PhiloMonaco de l'Essai, 2021; Prix Paul-Ricœur (2019); Prix de la Fondation de l'écologie politique (2017)

Education
- Education: University of Caen; École Normale Supérieure; Lycée Henri IV
- Thesis: Machiavel, Tocqueville, Marx dans la pensée politique française de l’entre-deux-guerres, (2000)
- Doctoral advisors: Robert Legros

Philosophical work
- Era: Contemporary philosophy
- Region: Western philosophy
- Institutions: Paris-Sorbonne University; Côte d'Azur University
- Language: French
- Main interests: Politics, morality, ecology
- Notable works: La Cité écologique (2020); L'Âge productiviste (2019); La société écologique et ses ennemis (2017)

Serge Audier is a French philosopher who teaches at the Côte d'Azur University in Nice. He is most notable for his writing on political and ideological conflicts as well as the philosophy of ecology. He is considered a leading authority on the history of liberalism in France.

== Education ==
He studied at the Lycée Henri IV in the fifth arrondissement of Paris. He won first prize in French composition in the Concours général in 1987 and first prize in philosophy in the Concours général in 1988. The next phase of his career was at the École normale supérieure, class of 1990, where he obtained the Agrégation de philosophie in 1994. He became a Doctor of Philosophy in 2000 with a thesis that won the Raymond-Aron prize in 2001.

Under the direction of Robert Legros, he defended his thesis in December 2000. The thesis was titled, "Machiavel, Tocqueville, Marx dans la pensée politique française de l’entre-deux-guerres," and the doctorate was granted by the University of Caen.

== Career ==
A former resident of the Thiers Foundation and a member of the Institut Universitaire de France (IUF), (Note: he was a junior member from 2007 and promoted to senior member in 2024) he was a lecturer in the philosophy department at Paris-Sorbonne University for many years (2003–2023). Since 2023, he has been a professor at the Côte d'Azur University in Nice.

== Research ==
Audier’s work is characterized by a genealogical approach to political ideas. He studies how internally diverse traditions such as republicanism, socialism, liberalism, and neoliberalism became reduced to simplified and apparently coherent narratives. (Note: "It is here that Audier is at his most penetrating. The two lengthy chapters he devotes to the layers of networks that tied together the key actors of mid-twentieth century liberalism can sometimes read like a succession of mini-biographies but they demonstrate clearly the degree to which European and American liberalism lacked unity when faced with the tragedies of the age." (Chabal, 2012).) His research examines which interpretations came to dominate, which alternatives were obscured or forgotten, and how these lost lines of thought may be recovered. (Note: "The aim is to disentangle myth from reality and rehabilitate ‘lost’ ideas." (Chabal, 2012).)

Audier later applied this approach to the history of political ecology. In La Société écologique et ses ennemis and L’Âge productiviste, he traces the emergence of productivism as a dominant political narrative while recovering ideas that were marginalized by those dominant partisan agendas. His theory about why movements on the political Left in particular have failed to adequately address climate change is due to what he calls "the cult of productivism," that is the drive toward production that began with the Industrial Revolution but never ceased: contradictory drives to produce more, even at the climate's expense, because of political and economic drives to produce not just what is economically profitable but what provides resources and the imperatives of electoral politics.

== Awards ==
One of his best known works, La Cité écologique : pour un éco-républicanisme, won the Essay Prize awarded by Les Rencontres Philosophiques de Monaco (also known as PhiloMonaco) in 2021.

His 2019 book, L'Âge productiviste: hégémonie prométhéenne, brèches et alternatives écologiques, won the Prix Paul Ricœur.

His 2017 book, La société écologique et ses ennemis. Pour une histoire alternative de l’émancipation, won the Prix de la Fondation de l'écologie politique in that year.

== Publications ==
=== Books ===
- Les Théories de la République, Paris, La Découverte, coll. « Repères », 2004, 119p. (ISBN 2707139092); revised and expanded edition, 2014, 125p. ISBN 9782707178503.
- Raymond Aron : la démocratie conflictuelle, Paris, Michalon, coll. « Le bien commun », 2004, 123p.
- Tocqueville retrouvé : genèse et enjeux du renouveau tocquevillien français (adapted from the author's doctoral thesis), Paris, chez Vrin / Éditions de l'EHESS, coll. « Contextes », 2004, 319p. ISBN 978-2-7116-1630-5.
- Machiavel, conflit et liberté, Paris, Librairie philosophique J. Vrin / Éditions de l'EHESS, coll. « Contextes », 2005, 313p. ISBN 9782711617487.
- Le Socialisme libéral, Paris, La Découverte, coll. « Repères : sciences politiques, droit », 2006, 121p.; revised and expanded edition, 2014, 125p. ISBN 9782707178190
- Léon Bourgeois : fonder la solidarité, Paris, Michalon, coll. « Le bien commun », 2007, 125p. ISBN 9782841864300
- La Pensée anti-68 : essai sur une restauration intellectuelle, Paris, La Découverte, coll. « Cahiers libres », 2008, 379p. ISBN 9782707153371
- Le Colloque Lippmann : aux origines du néo-libéralisme, Lormont, Le Bord de l'eau, coll. « Les voies du politique », 2008, 354p. ISBN 9782915651942; revised and expanded edition, preceded by "Penser le 'néo-libéralisme'", 2012, 495p. ISBN 9782356871671
- La Pensée solidariste. Aux sources du modèle social républicain, Paris, PUF, 2010, 340p. ISBN 9782130570950
- Néo-libéralisme(s) : une archéologie intellectuelle, Paris, Grasset, coll. « Mondes vécus », 2012, 628p. ISBN 9782246736615
- Penser le néolibéralisme : le moment néolibéral, Foucault et la crise du socialisme, Lormont, Le Bord de l'eau, coll. « Documents », 2015, 563p. ISBN 9782-356874030
- with Jurgen Reinhoudt, The Walter Lippmann Colloquium: The Birth of Neo-Liberalism, Palgrave Macmillan, 2017, 212p. ISBN 9783319658841.
- La Société écologique et ses ennemis : pour une histoire alternative de l'émancipation, Paris, La Découverte, 2017, 742p. ISBN 9782707194008 — Winner of the Prix de la Fondation de l'écologie politique (2017). ISBN 9782707194008.
- L'Âge productiviste : hégémonie prométhéenne, brèches et alternatives écologiques, Paris, La Découverte, 2019, 967p. ISBN 9782707198921 — Winner of the Prix Paul-Ricœur (2019)
- La Cité écologique : pour un éco-républicanisme, Paris, La Découverte, 2020, 752p. ISBN 9782348059803 — Winner of the Prix de l'Essai des Rencontres Philosophiques de Monaco (2021)
- L'Invention du néolibéralisme : histoire, concepts, controverses, vol. 1: Devant la crise du libéralisme : du colloque Lippmann à la société du Mont Pèlerin, Lormont, BDL Editions, 2022, 514p. ISBN 9782356878700.
- L'Invention du néolibéralisme : histoire, concepts, controverses, vol. 2: Quel néolibéralisme ? : les "Pélerins" en quête d'hégémonie, Lormont, BDL Editions, 2023, 524p. ISBN 9782356878717.

=== Periodicals ===
- Qu'est-ce que la philosophie ?, Monaco, Les Rencontres Philosophiques de Monaco, 2023, 75 p.
- "Néolibéralisme, inégalités et enjeux écologiques." Cités 89, no. 1 (2022): 27-49.
- "Les paradigmes du «Néolibéralisme»." Cahiers philosophiques 133, no. 2 (2013): 21-40.
- "La gauche réformiste et le libéralisme." L'Économie politique 40, no. 4 (2008): 83-100.
- "Tocqueville et la tradition républicaine." Cahiers de Philosophie de l’université de Caen 44 (2007): 171-245.
- "Tocqueville, notre contemporain?." Études 404, no. 4 (2006): 487-496.

== See also ==
- Niccolò Machiavelli
- Alexis de Tocqueville
- Léon Bourgeois
- Karl Marx
- Raymond Aron
- Jacques Rancière
- Liberalism and radicalism in France
