= Patrick Savidan =

French philosopher

- Born: La Roche-sur-Yon
- Occupations: Professor, publisher, editor

Education
- Education: University of Toulon; University of Ottawa; Paris-Sorbonne University
- Thesis: Kant's theory of subjecticity (1999)
- Doctoral advisor: Alain Renaut

Philosophical work
- Era: Contemporary Philosophy
- Region: Western Philosophy
- Institutions: Paris-Panthéon-Assas University; Paris-East Créteil University; University of Poitiers
- Main interests: Political philosophy, Critical philosophy, social justice, multiculturalism, Income inequality
- Notable works: Voulons-nous vraiment l'égalité? (2015); Repenser l'égalité des chances (2007)
- Website: patricksavidan.com

Patrick Savidan is a French philosopher.

== Early life and education ==
He was born in 1965 in La Roche-sur-Yon, the son of a career military officer. He spent his childhood on various military bases across Germany and France.

His teachers steered him towards vocational education. He obtained a Brevet d'études professionnelles (BEP) in Accounting, but left school during his première year, the penultimate year of French secondary education.

He competed in judo and rugby. He played for the USON Nevers in Bourges, in the second division.

Then he resumed his studies while working as a freelance sports reporter for the Var Matin newspaper in Toulon and affiliated with the Nice-Matin media group. He took the baccalaureat as an independent candidate and enrolled in law school at the University of Toulon

After completing his initial law studies, he received a scholarship to pursue a master's degree in political science at the University of Ottawa in Canada. There, he studied theorists of the Frankfurt School and, under the supervision of political scientist Koula Mellos, wrote a thesis on Adorno and Habermas. He subsequently changed course to prepare for the Agrégation in philosophy, which he passed in 1996, and then was appointed as a teacher at the Lycée Dessaignes in Blois. Later, at the Paris-Sorbonne University, he defended a doctoral thesis on the critical philosophy of the subject developed by Immanuel Kant, under the supervision of philosopher Alain Renaut. His work falls within the fields of contemporary political philosophy and ethics, focusing in particular on issues of social justice and democracy.

== Work ==
Savidan was an associate professor at the Paris-Sorbonne University from 2000-2009.

He was a professor in political philosophy at University of Poitiers from 2009-2016, then at Paris-East Créteil University (ex-Paris 12) from 2016-2021. Since 2021, he has been a professor at the Paris-Panthéon-Assas University, in the department of public administration and political science.

In 2003, he cofounded the Observatoire des inégalités, of which he served as president from its inception until 2018; he remains the chair of its scientific council to this day.

He is also an editor. He worked as a series editor for collections at Éditions Grasset (2002-2014), then at Éditions Albin Michel (2014-2017) and finally at Éditions Odile Jacob. He is currently the editorial director at Éditions Raison publique, a publishing house he founded in 2017 as an extension of the political philosophy revue that he founded in 2003.

From 2018-2020, he was a member of conseil scientifique de l'Éducation nationale (CSEN).

In 2022, he joined a conference on the topic of risk with philosopher Étienne Bimbenet as well as the author and lecturer Thierry Consigny. Savidan and Bimbenet are both members of the jury at Les Rencontres Philosophiques de Monaco. He frequently participates in the philosophical meetings and workshops in Monaco.

== Research ==
Savidan is a key figure in the renewed focus on the issue of equality in France. He has spearheaded numerous scholarly initiatives aimed at reintroducing issues of social justice into French public debate, specifically the need to further realize the republican ideal of equality and liberty (understood as the absence of domination) in the face of rising inequalities in contemporary post-industrial societies.

In Repenser l'égalité des chances (2007), Savidan emphasizes that equality of opportunity requires significant resources (health, housing, education, training, etc.) to be socially mobilized so that every new generation—and every individual within that generation—has an equal chance. He argues that a highly individualistic conception of equality of opportunity fails to achieve this goal; instead, it tends to reinforce inequalities. For equality of opportunity to become "sustainable," he believes it must foster "social relations that do not render equality of opportunity impossible." To this end, he proposes framing it within a perspective based on solidarity.

In Voulons-nous vraiment l'égalité ? (Do We Really Want Equality?), published in 2015, he examines the reasons behind behaviors (whether in the realm of education, in interactions with social welfare systems, and so on) that tend to exacerbate inequalities, even though many of us proclaim a desire for equality.

Is it a "weakness of will"? Is it a desire for distinction? According to Savidan’s analyses, it is more likely the result of uncertainties that weaken the commitment to solidarity, favoring instead the pursuit of security for one's own loved ones.

The perspectives he develops emerge from a dialogue between Continental and Anglo-Saxon philosophical traditions and place significant emphasis on the contributions of republicanism and the pragmatism of John Dewey, a philosopher whose work The Quest for Certainty: A Study of the Relation of Knowledge and Action (Paris, Gallimard, 2014 [1929]) he translated.

== Published works ==
- Dictionnaire des inégalités et de la justice sociale, editor, Paris: Presses universitaires de France, 2018.
- Du minimalisme moral: Essais pour Ruwen Ogien, co-edited with Roberto Merrill, Paris: Éditions Raison publique, 2018.
- Dire les inégalités: Représentations, figures, savoirs, co-edited with Raphaëlle Guidée, Rennes: Presses universitaires de Rennes, 2017.
- Voulons-nous vraiment l'égalité ?, Paris: Éditions Albin Michel, September 2015.
- Le multiculturalisme, Paris: Presses universitaires de France, Que sais-je ?, 2nd ed., 2011. First published 2009.
- Repenser l'égalité des chances, Paris: Hachette, Hachette Littératures/Pluriel, 2010. First published 2007. ISBN 978-2-01-279429-0.
- L'État des inégalités en France 2009, co-edited with Louis Maurin, Paris: Belin, 2008.
- "Démocratie participative et conflit." Revue de métaphysique et de morale, 2008/2 n° 58, 2008. p. 177-189.
- L'État des inégalités en France 2007, co-edited with Louis Maurin, Paris: Belin, 2006.
- Dictionnaire des sciences humaines, co-edited with Sylvie Mesure, Paris: Presses universitaires de France, 2006.
- La République ou l'Europe ?, editor, Paris: Le Livre de poche, Biblio essais, 2004.
- “Les inégalités”, Comprendre, no. 4, co-edited with Jean-Paul Fitoussi, Paris: Presses universitaires de France, 2003.
- Pluralisme et délibération: Enjeux de la philosophie politique contemporaine, co-edited with Koula Mellos, Ottawa: Presses de l'Université d'Ottawa, 1999.
- Histoire de la philosophie politique, edited by A. Renaut and coordinated by P. Savidan and P.-H. Tavoillot, five volumes, Paris: Calmann-Lévy, 1999.
- La Culture de la dette, with Patrice Martin, Montreal: Boréal, 1994.

== Translations ==
- Michael Sandel, Justice, Paris: Albin Michel, April 2016.
- John Dewey, La quête de certitude: Une étude du rapport entre connaissance et action, Paris: Gallimard, Bibliothèque de philosophie, 2014. Originally published in English in 1929.
- John R. Bowen, L'Islam: un ennemi idéal, Paris: Albin Michel, 2014.
- Charles Taylor, L’Âge séculier, Paris: Seuil, 2011.
- John Stuart Mill, Considérations sur le gouvernement représentatif, Paris: Gallimard, 2009. Originally published in English in 1861.
- Philip Pettit, Républicanisme: Une théorie de la liberté et du gouvernement, translated from English with Jean-Fabien Spitz, Paris: Gallimard, NRF, 2004. ISBN 978-2-0707-6838-7.
- John Searle, Liberté et neurobiologie, Paris: Grasset, Nouveau collège de philosophie, 2003.
- Jürgen Habermas, Éthique de la discussion et la question de la vérité, Paris: Grasset, Nouveau collège de philosophie, 2003.
- Will Kymlicka, La citoyenneté multiculturelle, Paris: Boréal and Éditions La Découverte, Textes à l'appui / Politique et sociétés, 2001.
