= Éditions Érès =

Les Éditions Érès
- Founded: 1980
- Founders: Georges Hahn & Jean Sacrispeyre
- Country of origin: France
- Headquarters location: Toulouse
- Nonfiction topics: social sciences, humanities
- Official website: https://www.editions-eres.com

(Les) Éditions Érès is a French publishing house specializing in the social sciences and humanities, established in 1980 by Georges Hahn and Jean Sacrispeyre.

The published works are primarily aimed at an audience of psychiatry or psychoanalysis professionals, legal experts, and social workers.

The editorial scope covers the following themes:

- Law and criminology
- Education and training
- Childhood and parenting
- Gerontology
- Psychoanalysis
- Mental health
- Society

The company won the Publisher's Prize awarded by Les Rencontres Philosophiques de Monaco in 2024.

== See also ==
- Books in France
- Culture of France
- French people
