= Étienne Bimbenet =

French philosopher

- Born: 1967 (age 58–59); Paris
- Occupation: Philosopher
- Awards: Prix PhiloMonaco de l'Essai, 2018; Prix Dagnan-Bouveret, 2012

Education
- Education: Blaise Pascal University, Clermont-Ferrand; École Normale Supérieure, Paris
- Thesis: Nature and humanity in Merleau-Ponty's works (2001)
- Doctoral advisors: Renaud Barbaras

Philosophical work
- Era: Contemporary philosophy
- Region: Western philosophy
- Institutions: Paris 1 Panthéon-Sorbonne University (2024-present); Bordeaux Montaigne University (before 2024)
- Language: French
- Main interests: phenomenology
- Notable ideas: Species difference & respect in the study of philosophical anthropology & animal ethics

Étienne Bimbenet (born in 1967 in Paris) is a French philosopher who specializes in contemporary phenomenology.

== Education and background ==
The title of his thesis was Nature et humanité dans l'oeuvre de Merleau-Ponty (Nature and humanity in Merleau-Ponty's works.) He defended it under the supervision of Renaud Barbaras. After obtaining his diploma in 2001, from Université Blaise Pascal.

He also studied at l'École normale supérieure in Paris.

He became a professor of contemporary philosophy at l’Université Paris 1 Panthéon-Sorbonne, where he has been since 2024. He had previously been a professor of philosophy at Bordeaux Montaigne University and prior to that, had been assigned to Jean Moulin University Lyon 3.

== Research ==
In line with his work on Merleau-Ponty's theories, he proposes a phenomenological anthropology centered on our animal origins and on the specificity of human behavior. In dialogue with child psychology and primatology, he defends the principle of a "naturalism of second nature" (John McDowell).

Bimbenet takes a predominantly phenomenological approach in his work. He often stresses the importance of opening the eyes and seeing; the emphasis on perception is evident throughout his writing. He studies distinctions and difference. He investigates philosophical anthropology, particularly human difference from nonhuman animals. Thus, his methods are phenomenological and the objective of his analysis is bent toward animal ethics. He believes strongly in the importance for an understanding and respect of anthropological difference among species if we are to treat each other ethically.

== Activities ==
With Bruce Bégout, he co-edited the collection Matière étrangère (foreign matter), published by Éditions Vrin.

He is a member of the editorial board for the journal Alter.

Bimbenet is a member of the jury for the prizes of Les Rencontres Philosophiques de Monaco.

In 2017, he joined a group of scholars in signing a petition to support activists from L214, a French animal rights group, who stood trial for entering a slaughterhouse. Bimbenet and his fellow signatories were in support of their rights to gather information about the facility.

In 2019, he gave a lecture for students in Monaco, called Pourquoi donne-t-on ? (Why do we give?)

In 2022, he joined a conference on the topic of risk with philosopher Patrick Savidan as well as the author and lecturer Thierry Consigny. He has attended other philosophical meetings in Monaco, such as the Colloquium in 2020 and 2021, and the Workshop (Atelier) on time, history, and testimony in 2020. He is one of the contributors to the Qu’est-ce que la philosophie? series that is published by Librairie philosophique J. Vrin.

== Awards ==
- In 2012, he received the Prix Dagnan-Bouveret (Académie des sciences morales et politiques) for L’Animal que je ne suis plus (Gallimard, 2011)
- En 2018, he received the Prix d'Essai des Rencontres philosophiques de Monaco for Le Complexe des trois singes. Essai sur l’animalité humaine (Le Seuil, 2017)

== Selected works ==
=== English translated ===
- Merleau-Ponty and the Quarrel over the Conceptual Contents of Perception. Graduate Faculty Philosophy Journal, The New School for Social Research. 30:1. April 2009.
- “The Fallacy of Human Animality.” Environmental Philosophy 11, no. 1 (2014): 27–44.
- (with Samuel Robeson Webb.) “For an Anthropological Turn in Phenomenology.” Phänomenologische Forschungen, no. 1 (2021): 5–20.

=== French titles ===
==== Books ====
- Qu’est-ce que la philosophie ?. Les Rencontres Philosophiques de Monaco. Part of a series and a transcript of a conference held on 7 June 2019 at the Oceanographic Museum of Monaco. ISBN 9782711631827. EAN 9772414376002.
- Le Complexe des trois singes. Essai sur l’animalité humaine, Paris, Éditions du Seuil, Collection l’Ordre philosophique. October 2017.
- L’Invention du réalisme, Paris, Éditions du Cerf, collection Passages, 2015. ISBN 9782204104005.
- L’Animal que je ne suis plus, Paris, Éditions Gallimard, collection Folio Essais inédit, 2011. ISBN 9782070441594.
- Après Merleau-Ponty. Études sur la fécondité d’une pensée, Paris, Librairie philosophique J. Vrin, collection Problèmes et Controverses, 2011. ISBN 9782711623556.
- Nature et Humanité. Le problème anthropologique dans l’œuvre de Merleau-Ponty, Paris, Éditions Vrin, collection Histoire de la philosophie, 2004. ISBN 9782711616619.
- La nature: approches philosophiques. France: Éditions Vrin, 2002.
- L’Ordre humain. Commentaire de La Structure du comportement. III, 3. Paris, Éditions Ellipses, 2000.

==== Periodicals ====
- "«La chasse sans prise»: Merleau-ponty et le projet d'une science de l'homme sans l'homme." Les études philosophiques 57, no. 2 (2001): 239-259.
- " Les pensees barbares du premier age": Merleau-Ponty et la psychologie de I'enfant." Chiasmi International: publication trilingue autour de la pensée de Merleau-Ponty= trilingual studies concerning the thought of Merleau-Ponty= pubblicazione trilingue intorno al pensiero di Merleau-Ponty: 4, 2002 (2002): 65-86.
- "Sens pratique et pratiques réflexives: Quelques développements sociologiques de l'ontologie merleau-pontienne." Archives de philosophie 69, no. 1 (2006): 57–78.
- "Pour une approche phénoménologique de l’attention conjointe." Alter. Revue de phénoménologie 18 (2010): 93–110.
- "Merleau-Ponty et la querelle des contenus conceptuels de la perception." Rue Descartes 70, no. 4 (2010): 4-23.
- with Christian Sommer. "Les métaphores de l'humain: L'anthropologie de Hans Blumenberg." Le débat 180, no. 3 (2014): 89–97.
- "La formule transcendantale. Sur l’apport de la phénoménologie à l’anthropologie philosophique." Alter. Revue de phénoménologie 23 (2015): 206–225.
- Merleau-Ponty à l’âge de l’anthropocène. (2025). Esprit, https://shs.cairn.info/revue-esprit-2025-3?lang=fr. Co-written with Corine Pelluchon and Judith Revel for Revue Esprit. Kindle edition: ISBN 9782372343282.
