= Grand prix de philosophie =

The Grand prix de philosophie is an annual award created by the Académie française in 1987.

== Laureates ==
Grand Prix de Philosophie winners
Year	Author	work	prize
2021	Emmanuel Housset	for all of his work	3,800 €
2020	Claude Romano	for all of his work	3,800 €
2019	Jacques Bouveresse	for all of his work	3,800 €
2018	Didier Franck	for all of his work	3,800 €
2017	Christian Jambet	for all of his work	3,800 €
2016	Jean Vioulac	for all of his work	3,800 €
2015	Alain de Libera	for all of his work	3,800 €
2014	Renaud Barbaras	for all of his work	3,800 €
2013	Jean-François Courtine	for all of his work	3,800 €
2012	Barbara Cassin	for all of her work	3,750 €
2011	François Jullien	for all of his work	3,800 €
2010	Vincent Carraud	for all of his work	3,750 €
2009	Rémi Brague	for all of his work	3,750 €
2008	Olivier Boulnois	Au-delà de l’image. Une archéologie du visuel au Moyen Âge & all of his other work	3,750 €
2007	Gilles Dowek	Les Métamorphoses du calcul. Une étonnante histoire de mathématiques	3,750 €
2006	Roland Meynet	L’Évangile de Luc	3,750 €
2005	Vincent Descombes	Le complément de sujet	3,750 €
2004	Charles Larmore	Les pratiques du moi	3,750 €
2003	Jean-François Marquet	for all of his work	3,750 €
2002	Per Aage Brandt	for all of his work	7,500 €
2001	Pierre Magnard	for all of his work	50,000 Francs
2000	Gustave Thibon	for all of his work	50,000 Francs
1999	Pierre Hadot	for all of his work	50,000 Francs
1998	Adolphe Gesché	Dieu pour Penser and for all of his work	50,000 Francs
1996	René Girard	for all of his work	50,000 Francs
1994	Gilles Deleuze	for all of his work	50,000 Francs
1993	Isabelle Stengers	for all of her work	50,000 Francs
1992	Jean-Luc Marion	for all of his work	50,000 Francs
1991	Paul Ricoeur	for all of his work	50,000 Francs
1990	Emmanuel Lévinas	for all of his work	50,000 Francs
1989	René-Jean Dupuy	La Clôture du système international ou La Cité terrestre	50,000 Francs
1987	Jacques Ruffié	for all of his work	50,000 Francs
