= Claire Marin =

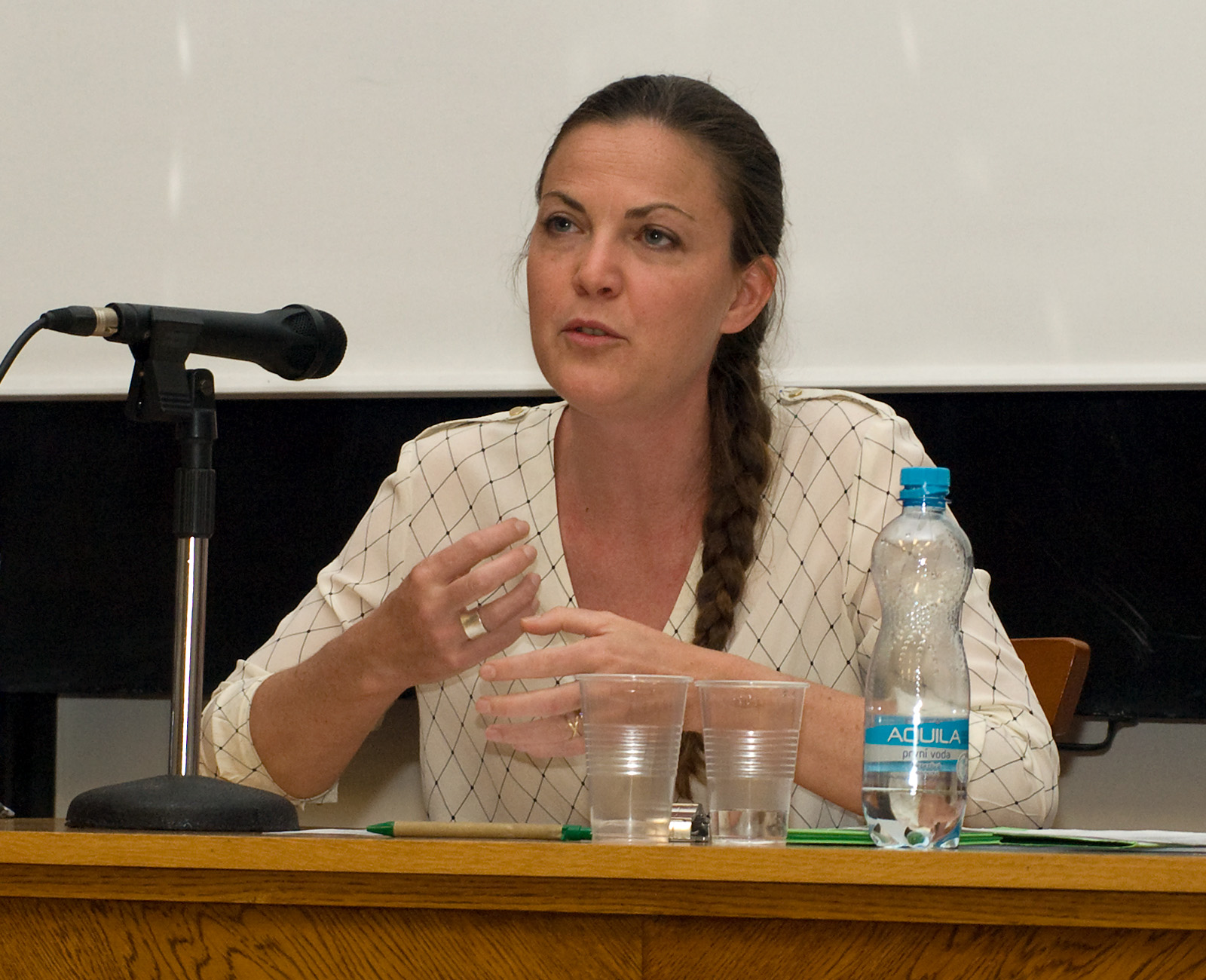
- Born: November 14, 1974 (age 51); Paris
- Occupations: Philosopher, professor, writer

Education
- Education: École normale supérieure de lettres et sciences humaines
- Thesis: "Obscure activity" in Félix Ravaisson's philosophy (2003)
- Doctoral advisor: Jean-François Courtine

Philosophical work
- Era: Contemporary philosophy
- Region: Western philosophy
- Institutions: Paris-Sorbonne University (Paris IV)
- Notable works: Hors de moi (2008); Violences de la vie, violences de la maladie (2008); Rupture(s) (2020); Être à sa place (2022)

Claire Marin (born November 14, 1974, in Paris) is a French philosopher, writer, and professor.

== Early life and education ==
Marin grew up in Grigny, Essonne and then near Nantes, the daughter of a secretary and a computer engineer.

She enrolled at École normale supérieure de lettres et sciences humaines in Fontenay-aux-Roses-Saint-Cloud in 1994. In 2003, she obtained a doctorate in philosophy from the Paris-Sorbonne University (Paris IV) with a thesis topic focusing on "obscure activity" in the philosophy of Félix Ravaisson-Mollien and supervised by Jean-François Courtine. She also passed the Agrégation.

== Academic career ==
She taught for many years at the Lycée Eugène-Ionesco in Issy-les-Moulineaux. She also taught at the Lycée Janson-de-Sailly in Paris. In 2008, she published her first novel, Hors de moi (Éditions Allia) and an essay, Violences de la maladie, violence de la vie (Armand Colin).

From 2011, for about ten years, she was a professor in philosophy in the classes préparatoires at the Lycée Alfred-Kastler in Cergy-Pontoise. She is a member of the Centre international d'études de la philosophie française contemporaine (PhilOfr) at the École normale supérieure in the Rue d'Ulm, Paris.

She is a member of the jury for the awards giving at Les Rencontres Philosophiques de Monaco.

== Reception ==
Her essays which draw on literature and philosophy have received a number of awards. Adèle Van Reeth, current director of France Inter, who edited Rupture(s) and Être à sa place (Éditions de l'Observatoire, 2022), explains: "She excels in the art of storytelling, in linking concepts to lived experience, in anchoring philosophy in love relationships or the mother-child bond, by assuming the 'I'."

Her books sell well over time; for example, Rupture(s), published in 2019, reached 31,800 copies sold in December 2022 and 87,000 in 2023.

== Awards and distinctions ==
- 2008: Prix Jean Bernard, awarded by the Académie nationale de médecine for Hors de moi (Éditions Allia, 2008)
- 2010: Prix Pierre Simon Éthique et Société, in the category for ethics and reflection, for Violences de la vie, violences de la maladie.
- 2019: Prix des Savoirs for Rupture(s) (Editions de l'Observatoire, 2019)
- 2020: Prix lycéen du livre de philosophie for Rupture(s) (Editions de l'Observatoire, 2019).

== Personal life ==
Marin is married and lives in Paris.

== Works ==
=== Novel ===
- Hors de moi, Paris, Éditions Allia, 2008 ISBN 978-2-8448-5265-6

=== Non-fiction books ===
- Violences de la maladie, violence de la vie, Paris, Armand Colin, 2008 ISBN 978-2-2002-6983-8.
- La Maladie, catastrophe intime, Paris, PUF, 2014 ISBN 978-2-13-062495-0.
- La Relève, Les Éditions du Cerf, coll. Actualité, 2018. ISBN 9782204119924.
- Qu'allons-nous devenir ?, coll. Philophile - Giboulées, Gallimard Jeunesse, 2018, 62 p.ISBN 9782070599554.
- Rupture(s), Paris, Éditions de l'Observatoire, coll. La Relève, 2019, 160 p. ISBN 979-1032903360.
- Mon corps est-il bien à moi ?, coll. Philophile - Giboulées, Gallimard Jeunesse, 2020, 48 p. ISBN 978-2075124560.
- Être à sa place, L'Observatoire, 2022, 240 p. ISBN 9791032915165.
- Les Débuts: Par où recommencer ?, coll. Les Grands Mots, Éditions Autrement, 2023, 192 p. ISBN 978-2-74676-130-8.

=== Works by others (edited and compiled) ===
- De la nature à l'esprit, introduction à la philosophie française du 19th century, avec R. Belay (dir.), Lyon, Presses de l'École normale supérieure, 2001.
- L'Épreuve de soi (dir.), Paris, Armand Colin, coll. L'inspiration philosophique, 2003.
- Souffrance et douleur: authored by Paul Ricœur, with Nathalie Zaccaï-Reyners, Paris, PUF, 2013. ISBN 9782130607229.

=== Articles ===
- "1. Maladie et identité." Questions de soin (2014): 11–18.
- "Réapprendre la maladie." Esprit 5 (2020): 55–60.
- Ton âge, Femmes, La Nouvelle Revue Française, Spring 2023, pp. 13–15.
