= Boris Cyrulnik =

French psychiatrist

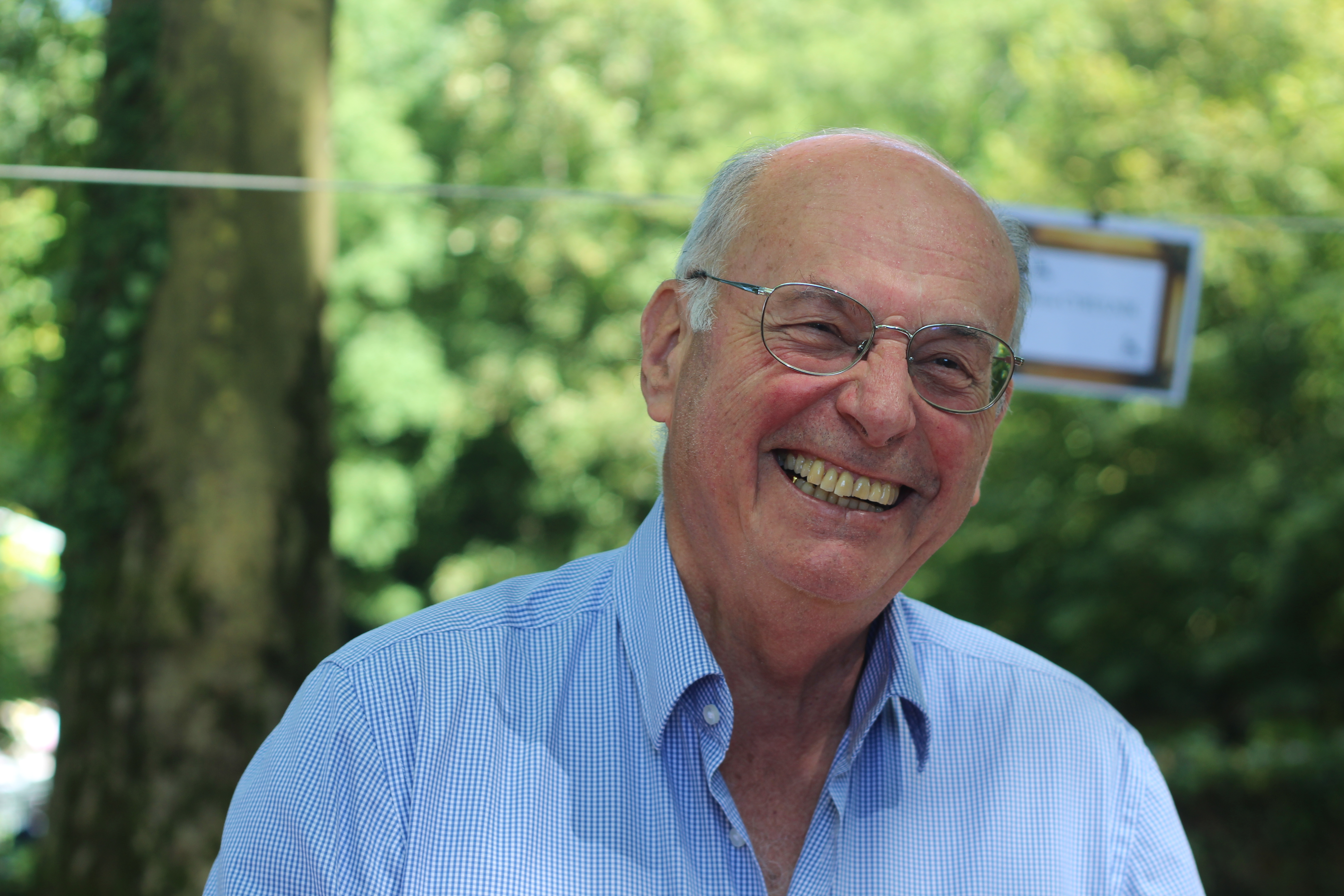
- Cyrulnik in 2014
- Born: 26 July 1937 (age 89); Bordeaux, France
- Education: University of Paris
- Notable work: Psychological resilience

Boris Cyrulnik (born 26 July 1937 in Bordeaux) is a French doctor, ethologist, neurologist, and psychiatrist.

As a Jewish child during World War II, he was entrusted to a foster family for his own protection. In 1943, he was taken with adults in a Nazi-led capture in Bordeaux. He avoided detention by hiding for a while in the restrooms and later being hidden from Nazi searches as a farm boy under the name Jean Laborde until the end of the war. Both of his parents were arrested and murdered during World War II. His own survival motivated his career in psychiatry. He studied medicine at the University of Paris. He has written several books of popular science on psychology. He is known in France for developing and explaining to the public the concept of Psychological resilience.

He is a professor at the University of the South, Toulon-Var. He was awarded the 2008 Prix Renaudot de l'essai.

== Works ==
=== In French ===
- Mémoire de singe et paroles d'homme, ed. Hachette, 1983.
- Sous le signe du lien, ed. Hachette, 1989.
- La Naissance du sens, ed. Hachette, 1991.
- Les Nourritures affectives, ed. Odile Jacob, 1993.
- De la parole comme d'une molécule, with Émile Noël, ed. Seuil, 1995.
- L'Ensorcellement du monde, ed. Odile Jacob, 1997.
- La Naissance du sens ed. Hachette Littérature, 1998 (ISBN 978-2012788916).

English translation: The Dawn of Meaning

- Un merveilleux malheur, ed. Odile Jacob, 1999; re-edition in 2002 (ISBN 2-7381-1125-4).
- Dialogue sur la nature humaine, with Edgar Morin, ed. de l'Aube, 2000.
- Les Vilains Petits Canards, ed. Odile Jacob, 2001 (ISBN 2-7381-0944-6).
- L'Homme, la Science et la Société, ed. de l'Aube, 2003.
- Le Murmure des fantômes, ed. Odile Jacob, 2003; ed. Odile Jacob poches, 2005 (ISBN 2-7381-1674-4);

English translation: The Whispering of Ghosts: Trauma and Resilience, 2005.

- Parler d'amour au bord du gouffre, ed. Odile Jacob, 2004.

English translation: Talking of Love on the Edge of a Precipice, 2007.

- La Petite Sirène de Copenhague, ed. l'Aube, 2005.
- De chair et d'âme, ed. Odile Jacob, 2006.
- Autobiographie d'un épouvantail, ed. Odile Jacob, 2008 (ISBN 978-2-7381-2398-5).
- Je me souviens..., ed. L'Esprit du temps, coll. "Textes essentiels", 2009; ed. Odile Jacob poches, 2010 (ISBN 978-2-7381-2471-5).
- Mourir de dire: La honte, ed. Odile Jacob, 2010 (ISBN 978-2-7381-2505-7).
- Quand un enfant se donne "la mort", ed. Odile Jacob, 2011 (ISBN 978-2-7381-2688-7).
- Sauve-toi, la vie t'appelle, ed. Odile Jacob, 2012 (ISBN 978-2-7381-2862-1).
- Les âmes blessées, ed. Odile Jacob, 2014 (ISBN 978-2-7381-3146-1).
- Psychothérapie de Dieu, ed. Odile Jacob, coll. «OJ-Psychologie», 2017 (ISBN 978-2-7381-3887-3).

=== In English ===
- The Dawn of Meaning, ed. Mcgraw-Hill, coll. Horizons of Science, 1992.

Translation of: La Naissance du sens, ed. Hachette Littérature, 1998 ISBN 978-2-01-278891-6.

- The Whispering of Ghosts: Trauma and Resilience, 2005.

Translation of: Le Murmure des fantômes, ed. Odile Jacob, 2003.

- Talking of Love on the Edge of a Precipice , 2007.

Translation of: Parler d'amour au bord du gouffre, ed. Odile Jacob, 2004.

- Resilience: How Your Inner Strength Can Set You Free from the Past, ed. Tarcher, 320 pages, 2011 (ISBN 1-58542-850-7).

=== In German ===
- Warum die Liebe Wunden heilt, ed. Beltz GmbH, 2006, 232 pages (ISBN 978-3-407857767).

Translation of: Pourquoi l'amour guérit les plaies.

- Mit Leib und Seele, ed. Hoffmann und Campe. 2007, 272 pages ISBN 978-3-455500387.

Translation of: Corps et âme.

- Scham. Im Bann des Schweigens. Wenn Scham die Seele vergiftet, translated by Maria Buchwald and Andrea Alvermann, ed. Präsenz, 2011, 248 pages ISBN 9783876302126.

Translation of: Mourir de dire: La honte, ed. Odile Jacob, 2010 ISBN 978-2-7381-2505-7.

- Rette dich, das Leben ruft!, ed. Ullstein Buch Verlage GmbH, Berlin, 2013, 281 pages

Translation of: Sauve-toi, la vie t'appelle, ed. Odile Jacob, 2012 ISBN 978-2-7381-2862-1.

=== Prefaces ===
- Françoise Maffre-Castellani: Femmes déportées, Histoires de résilience (ISBN 978-2721005199)
- Patrick Lemoine: Séduire, comment l'amour vient aux humains, Rouge, 2002.

=== Collected works ===
- Enfance et violence. Boris Cyrulnik. 2018. Les Rencontres Philosophiques de Monaco.
- La Plus Belle Histoire des animaux, collectif, ed. Seuil, 2006.
- Si les lions pouvaient parler. Essais sur la condition animale, under direction of Boris Cyrulnik, ed. Gallimard, coll. "Quarto", Paris, 1998,.
- Boris Cyrulnik, "Instinct/Attachement", in Dictionnaire de la sexualité humaine, 200 blurbs by 122 coauthors, under direction of Philippe Brenot, ed. L'Esprit du temps, coll. "Les Dictionnaires", Paris, 2004, 736 pages, and Les Objets de la psychiatrie, conceptual dictionary, 230 blurbs by 150 auteurs, under direction of Yves Pélicier, ed. L'Esprit du temps, collection "Les Dictionnaires", Paris, 1997, 650 pages.
- Boris Cyrulnik and Claude Seron (dir.), La Résilience ou Comment renaître de sa souffrance, ed. Fabert, coll. "Penser le monde de l'enfant", Paris, 2004 (ISBN 2-907164-80-5).
- Nicolas Martin, Antoine Spire, François Vincent and Boris Cyrulnik, La Résilience. Entretien avec Boris Cyrulnik, ed. Le Bord de l'eau, coll. "Nouveaux Classiques", Lormont, France, 2009, 111 pages (ISBN 978-2356870261).
- With Jean-Pierre Pourtois: École et résilience ed. Odile Jacob (ISBN 978-2738120120).
- Nous étions des enfants, introductory Talk to 10 DVD set made by Jean-Gabriel Carasso and produced by L'oizeau rare with the Comité École de la rue Tlemcen. This work presents 18 testimonies of children deported or hidden, because of being Jews, during the Second World War.
