= Denis Kambouchner =

French philosopher (born 1953)

- Kambouchner in 2019
- Born: 26 June 1953 (age 73); Paris, France
- Citizenship: French
- Education: École normale supérieure; Paris Nanterre University (doctorate)
- Occupations: Philosopher, historian of philosophy
- Employer: Paris 1 Panthéon-Sorbonne University (emeritus)
- Known for: Work on the philosophy of Descartes
- Notable work: L'Homme des passions (1995); Descartes n'a pas dit (2015)
- Title: President of the Société française de philosophie
- Term: 2019–present

Denis Kambouchner (born 26 June 1953) is a French philosopher and historian of philosophy, a specialist in the thought of Descartes. He is an emeritus professor at Paris 1 Panthéon-Sorbonne University and has been president of the Société française de philosophie since 2019, in which capacity he edits the Revue de métaphysique et de morale. He directed the edition of Descartes' complete works published in the "Tel" collection of Gallimard (eight volumes, 2009–2023) and of his Œuvres in the Bibliothèque de la Pléiade (two volumes, 2024). He is a member of the jury for the annual awards presented by Les Rencontres Philosophiques de Monaco, where he regularly participates in symposiums and workshops.

== Biography ==
=== Youth and studies ===
Kambouchner was admitted to the École normale supérieure on rue d'Ulm in 1974 and passed the agrégation in philosophy in 1976. In 1990 he completed a doctoral thesis on the Cartesian problematic of affectivity, La problématique cartésienne de l'affectivité, at the University of Paris Nanterre, under the supervision of Geneviève Brykman.

=== Academic career ===
He began his career as a teacher at the University of Besançon. He then taught at the École normale supérieure before being elected a university professor at Clermont-Ferrand II and then at Paris Nanterre University, joining the University of Paris I in 2000. He has been an emeritus professor there since 2019. From 2008 to 2011 he was president of the jury for the external and internal agrégation examinations in philosophy.

== Work ==
=== Descartes ===
His doctoral thesis, and the two-volume L'Homme des passions published in 1995, contributed to restoring the importance of Descartes' treatise Les Passions de l'âme (1649), which had until then been relatively neglected by the secondary literature. The work helped to challenge the image of Descartes as simply a dualist and drew commentators' attention to the importance of the theory of the union of soul and body, and it criticised in particular the reading of Descartes offered by António Damásio in Descartes' Error.

Kambouchner had been a student of Jacques Derrida at the École normale supérieure in the 1970s; in 2023 he published Écrits pour Derrida (Writings for Derrida), an appreciation of Derrida's thought that examines the definition and scope of "deconstruction".

Alongside academic works on Descartes' metaphysics and moral philosophy, he wrote Descartes n'a pas dit (2015) for a wider audience: a "repertory of false ideas" about Descartes that sets out to correct received notions of his philosophy. He has occasionally contributed to newspapers for the same purpose. He has presided over the Société française de philosophie since January 2019, and in that capacity is the director of publication of the Revue de métaphysique et de morale. He directed the edition of Descartes' Œuvres complètes published by Gallimard in the "Tel" collection (eight volumes, 2009–2023), as well as that of the Œuvres in the Bibliothèque de la Pléiade (two volumes, 2024).

=== Philosophy of education and culture ===
Kambouchner has also published works in the philosophy of education and of culture. In "La filosofía de la educación en una posición crítica" (2011), written for a special issue of the Madrid journal Bajo Palabra devoted to the philosophy of education, he argued that the discipline had settled into a "normal" form in Thomas Kuhn's sense of the term, largely confined to answering institutional demands, and that it should renew itself by confronting the present with the great historical texts on education rather than by adopting an adaptive model drawn from contemporary psychology.

== Public positions ==
Kambouchner has been prominent in public debate over education policy. In August 2000 he published a refutation of the pedagogical positions of Philippe Meirieu under the polemical title Une école contre l'autre, affirming the urgency of reopening philosophical reflection on the school: "With the exception of a few courageous works, one must acknowledge a kind of drying-up, witnessed both by the almost complete absence of philosophy of education as an academic speciality and by the limited interest shown within the university and beyond in defining the tasks, contents and structures of a new system of mass education."

Hostile to the reforms proposed by Lionel Jospin, he advocated a return to a more classical education. When Luc Ferry and Jack Lang published a column in Le Nouvel Observateur against Xavier Darcos and the new school programmes, he took up his pen in Le Monde in support of the minister's policy: "To the principle of 'teach less in order to teach better', there is reason to prefer this other one: 'teach better by teaching more' – where 'more' does not mean here for longer, but transmitting more, beginning with the basics. Is such a principle reactionary? Not at all. Will it be readily received? That is another matter."

His book Quelque chose dans la tête (2019) is addressed to adults and adolescents alike. It insists on the need to give children a broad culture of all "the most beautiful things", while showing the necessity of taking "a certain liberty with regard to mass cultural products and attention-capturing systems".

== Publications ==
=== Single-authored works ===
- L'Homme des passions, 2 vols (Paris: Éditions Albin Michel, 1995)
- Une école contre l'autre (Paris: Presses universitaires de France, 2000)
- Le Vocabulaire de Descartes, with Frédéric de Buzon (Paris: Éditions Ellipses, 2002)
- Les Méditations métaphysiques de Descartes I (Paris: Presses universitaires de France, 2005)
- Descartes et la philosophie morale (Paris: Hermann, 2008)
- L'École, question philosophique (Paris: Fayard, 2013)
- Le Style de Descartes (Paris: Manucius, 2013)
- Descartes n'a pas dit (Paris: Les Belles Lettres, 2015)
- La Question Descartes : méthode, métaphysique, morale (Paris: Folio, 2023)
- Écrits pour Derrida (Paris: Manucius, 2023)
- Rendez-vous à Troie, novel (Paris: Les Belles Lettres, 2025)
- Des enfants instruits : réconcilier l'école et la culture (Paris: Les Belles Lettres, 2026)

=== Collective and edited volumes ===
- Notions de philosophie, 3 vols (Paris: Folio-Gallimard, 1995), directed the edition and contributed the article on culture
- La Crise de la culture scolaire : origines, interprétations, perspectives (Paris: Presses universitaires de France, 2005), colloquium co-organised with François Jacquet-Francillon
- Les Passions de l'âme à l'âge classique, edited by Pierre-François Moreau (philosopher) (Paris: PUF, 2006), contributor
- "Penser l'éducation aujourd'hui", special issue of the Revue de métaphysique et de morale (autumn 2007), editor
- Derrida. La Déconstruction, edited by Charles Ramond (Paris: Presses universitaires de France, 2008), contributor
- René Descartes : Œuvres complètes, 8 vols (Paris: Gallimard, "Tel" collection, 2009–2023), director
- René Descartes : Œuvres, 2 vols (Paris: Gallimard, "Bibliothèque de la Pléiade", 2024), director

=== Books for young readers ===
- De bonnes raisons d'être méchant ? (Paris: Gallimard Jeunesse, 2010)
- Quelque chose dans la tête, followed by Vous avez dit transmettre ? (Paris: Groupe Flammarion, 2019)

He debated Philippe Meirieu in the Revue française de pédagogie (no. 137, 2002) on "La pédagogie et les savoirs".
