= François-André-Adrien Pluquet =

French theologian and philosopher

François-André-Adrien Pluquet (14 June 1716 – 18 September 1790) was a French theologian and philosopher. Best known for his Dictionary of Heresies (1762), he also wrote treatises on determinism, sociability and luxury.

== Life ==
Pluquet was born in Bayeux. He studied in Caen and Paris, becoming a licencié of the Sorbonne in 1750. He worked as tutor to the abbé de Choiseul, younger brother of the Duc de Choiseul, who provided him with a pension allowing him to pursue independent study.

== Works ==
- Examen du fatalisme (Examination of determinism), 1757
- Dictionnaire des hérésies, des erreurs et des schismes (Dictionary of heresies, errors and schisms), 1762
  - Collection Golgotha: Éditions Jérôme Millon, 2017. 784p. ISBN 9782841373277.
- De la sociabilité (On sociability), 1767
- (tr. from Latin) Les livres classiques de l'Empire de la Chine (The classical books of the Chinese Empire) by François Noël. 7 vols, 1784–86.
- Traité philosophique et politique sur le luxe (Philosophical and political treatise on luxury), 2 vols, 1786
