= Jean-Louis Chrétien =

French philosopher and poet (1952–2019)

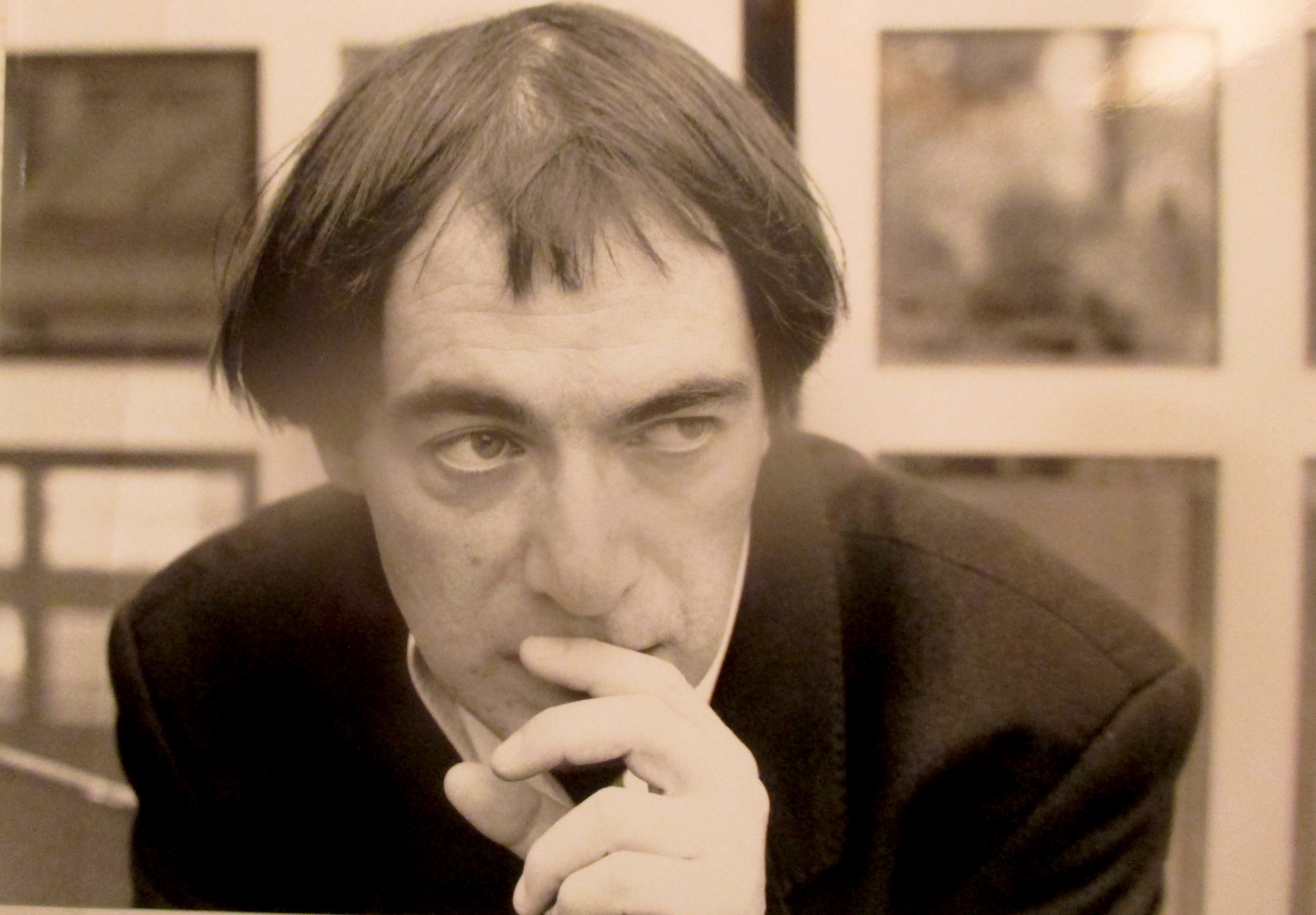
- Chrétien in 1987
- Born: 24 July 1952; Paris, France
- Died: 28 June 2019 (aged 66); Paris, France

Philosophical work
- Region: Western philosophy
- School: Continental philosophy Phenomenology
- Main interests: Philosophy of language; History of philosophy; Philosophy of religion; Platonism; Neoplatonism; Augustinianism; Patristics; Medieval Christianity

Jean-Louis Chrétien (French: [kʁetjɛ̃]; 24 July 1952 – 28 June 2019) was a French philosopher in the tradition of phenomenology as well as a poet and religious thinker. Author of over thirty books, he was the 2012 winner of the Cardinal Lustiger Prize for his life’s work in philosophy. He was professor emeritus of philosophy at the Sorbonne at the end of his career. The study of Chrétien increased widely after his death, a posthumous recognition that contrasts with his modest and solitary attitude.

== Biography ==
Born in Paris to Henri and Anna Chrétien, Chrétien was raised in an agnostic household. His father was a communist activist and doctor in the International Brigades in Spain, and had spent time in the Natzweiler-Struthof and Dachau concentration camps. As a young man in his mid-twenties, Chrétien went against his father’s wishes, converted to Catholicism, and was baptized on Pentecost Sunday. Henceforth, his faith would play a fundamental role in the development not only of his life, but his unique brand of philosophy. Chrétien studied at the Lycée Charlemagne in the late 1960s, and graduated with a first from the École Normale Supérieure (1971), as well as a first in the Agrégation de philosophie (1974). After teaching in secondary schools for a few years, he earned a doctorate from the Sorbonne in 1983. Early encounters with the philosopher Henri Maldiney played a significant role in guiding the pursuit of his philosophical vocation. His friendship with the philosopher Vladimir Jankélévitch was another factor, as well as a foundational encounter with the writings of Martin Heidegger. He wrote a dissertation under Pierre Aubenque on “The Hermeneutic of Obliquity in Neo-Platonism and Ancient Christianity.” After teaching for some years at the University of Créteil, Chrétien was invited to teach at the Sorbonne, where he obtained a chair in the history of philosophy of Late Antiquity and High Middle Ages. He taught courses there until 2017, when he retired to focus on writing. In 2012, he was awarded the Cardinal Lustiger Prize of the Académie Française, in recognition of the philosophical work of his lifetime.

== Philosophy ==
Chrétien was a phenomenologist, but one who consciously practiced within a tradition: not only the phenomenological tradition of Husserl, Heidegger, and Merleau-Ponty, but the Christian-Platonic tradition of Augustine. Throughout his works, he pursued deep engagements with philosophers and theologians in these traditions, as well as poets and novelists who could help him address the human questions in which he was interested. A chief research project of Chrétien’s through multiple publications was the experience of transcendence, what he called the “excess of the encounter with things, other, world, and God . . . this encounter requires, most imperatively, our response, and yet seems at the same time to prohibit it.” Many of his books trace different aspects of this basic picture, working out phenomenologies of personal encounter, response to the call of being (The Call and the Response), prayer (“The Wounded Word”), and art (Hand to Hand). Perhaps most centrally, his phenomenology finds its center in the experience of speech (The Ark of Speech), in which we are always trying to make the impossible response to the fundamental excess of reality. Thus, in a 2013 interview, Chrétien declared that "the guiding theme of all of my writings has been a phenomenology of speech as the place where all meaning comes to light and is received."

== Personal life ==
Chrétien remain unmarried throughout his life. He avoided modern technology, writing all of his books and articles by hand rather than using computers, and preferring personal communication wherever possible. This did not preclude his many deep friendships, and decades of mentoring relationships with students. He was known for his sense of humor, as well as his profound personal diffidence and avoidance of the limelight.

== Works ==
Books in French (and other languages):

- Lueur du secret, Paris, L'Herne, 1985.
- L'Effroi du beau, Paris, Cerf, 1987.
- L'Antiphonaire de la nuit, Paris, L'Herne, 1989.
- Traversées de l'imminence, Paris, L’Herne, 1989.
- La Voix nue : phénoménologie de la promesse, Paris, Minuit, 1990.
- Loin des premiers fleuves, Paris, La Différence, 1990.
- L'inoubliable et l'inespéré, Paris, Desclée de Brouwer, 1991.
- L'Appel et la Réponse, Paris, Minuit, 1992.
- Parmi les eaux violentes, Paris, Mercure de France, 1993.
- Effractions brèves, Sens, Obsidiane, 1995.
- De la fatigue, Paris, Minuit, 1996.
- Corps à corps : à l'écoute de l’œuvre d'art, Paris, Minuit, 1997.
- Entre flèche et cri, Sens, Obsidiane, 1998.
- L'Arche de la parole, Paris, PUF, « coll. Epiméthée » 1998.
- Le regard de l'Amour, Paris, Desclée de Brouwer, 2000.
- Joies escarpées, Sens, Obsidiane, 2001.
- Marthe et Marie, Paris, Desclée de Brouwer, 2002 (with Étienne Jollet and Guy Lafon).
- Saint Augustin et les actes de parole, Paris, PUF, « coll. Epiméthée », 2002.
- L'intelligence du feu: réponses humaines à une parole de Jésus, Paris, Bayard, 2003.
- Promesses furtives, Paris, Minuit, 2004.
- Symbolique du corps: la tradition chrétienne du Cantique des Cantiques, Paris, PUF, « coll. Epiméthée », 2005.
- La Joie spacieuse: essai sur la dilatation, Paris, Minuit, 2007.
- Répondre : figures de la réponse et de la responsabilité, Paris, PUF, « Chaire Étienne Gilson », 2007.
- Sous le regard de la Bible, Paris, Bayard-Centurion, coll. « Bible et philosophie », 2008.
- Conscience et roman. I, La conscience au grand jour, Paris, Minuit, « coll. Paradoxe », 2009.
- Pour reprendre et perdre haleine : dix brèves méditations, Paris, Bayard, 2009.
- Reconnaissances philosophiques, Paris, Le Cerf, 2010.
- Conscience et roman. II, La conscience à mi-voix, Paris, Minuit, « coll. Paradoxe », 2011.
- L’Espace intérieur, Paris, Minuit, « coll. Paradoxe », 2014.
- Fragilité, Minuit, coll. « Paradoxe », 2017.

Books in English Translation:

- The Unforgettable and the Unhoped For. Translated by Jeffrey Bloechl. New York: Fordham University Press, 2002. ISBN 978-0823221929
- The Ark of Speech. Translated by Andrew Brown. New York: Routledge, 2003. ISBN 978-0415276993
- Hand to Hand: Listening to the Work of Art. Translated by Stephen E. Lewis. New York: Fordham University Press, 2003. ISBN 978-0823222896
- The Call and the Response. Translated by Anne Davenport. New York: Fordham University Press, 2004. ISBN 978-0823222988
- Under the Gaze of the Bible. Translated by John Marson Dunaway. New York: Fordham University Press, 2014. ISBN 978-0823262328
- Spacious Joy: An Essay in Phenomenology and Literature. Translated by Anne Davenport. Lanham, MD: Rowman & Littlefield, 2019. ISBN 978-1786610560
- Ten Meditations for Catching and Losing One’s Breath. Translated by Steven DeLay. Eugene, OR: Wipf & Stock, 2024. ISBN 9781666766127

Essays and Book Chapters in English Translation:

- "The Wounded Word: A Phenomenology of Prayer." In Phenomenology and the Theological Turn: The French Debate. Edited by Dominique Janicaud, 147-175. New York: Fordham University Press, 2000. ISBN 978-0823220526
- "From the Limbs of the Heart to the Soul's Organs." In Carnal Hermeneutics. Edited by Richard Kearney & Brian Treanor, 92-114. New York: Fordham University Press, 2015. ISBN 978-0823265886
- "Attempting to Think Beyond Subjectivity." (An Interview with Camille Riquier and Marc Cerisuelo.) In Quiet Powers of the Possible: Interviews in Contemporary French Phenomenology. Translated by Tarek Dika and W. Chris Hackett, 228-238. New York: Fordham University Press, 2016. ISBN 978-0823264711
- "Split Interpretations of a Split I: Romans 7:7-25." In Phenomenologies of Scripture. Edited by Adam Y. Wells. Translated by Reuben Glick-Shank. New York: Fordham University Press, 2017. ISBN 978-0823275557
- "Martha and Mary: The Double Hospitality." Translated by Abigail Leali. Communio 47, No. 3 (Fall 2020): 471-502.
- "Prayer According to Kierkegaard." Translated by Filippo Pietrogrande. Journal for Continental Philosophy of Religion. 3, No. 2 (October 2021): 188–202.

== Sources ==
- Fetzer, Glenn W. "Jean-Louis Chrétien: Response and the Voice of Disclosure." In Palimpsests of the Real in Recent French Poetry, 31-40. New York: Rodopi, 2004. ISBN 978-9042017627
- Benson, Bruce Ellis, & Norman Wirzba, eds. "Part IV: Jean-Louis Chrétien." In Words of Life: New Theological Turns in French Phenomenology, 181-252. New York: Fordham University Press, 2010. ISBN 978-0823230723
- Gschwandtner, Christina M. "Jean-Louis Chrétien: A God of Speech and Beauty." In Postmodern Apologetics?: Arguments for God in Contemporary Philosophy, 143-162. New York: Fordham University Press, 2012. ISBN 978-0823242740
- Boer, Roland. "The Pure Givenness of the Call/Event: Between Alain Badiou and Jean-Louis Chrétien." Colloquium. 44.2 (Nov 2012), 163-176.
- Riquier, Camille, ed. "Le patient questionnement de Jean-Louis Chrétien." Special Issue of Critique. 790 (March 2013).
- Prevot, Andrew. "Responsorial Thought: Jean-Louis Chrétien's Distinctive Approach to Theology and Phenomenology." Heythrop Journal. 56.6 (Nov 2015), 875-987.
- Gschwandtner, Christina M. "Creativity as Call to Care for Creation? John Zizioulas and Jean-Louis Chrétien." In Being-In-Creation: Human Responsibility in an Endangered World, 100-112. Edited by Brian Treanor, Bruce Benson, and Norman Wirzba. New York: Fordham University Press, 2015. ISBN 978-0823264995
- Simmons, J. Aaron. "Living Joyfully after Losing Social Hope: Kierkegaard and Chrétien on Selfhood and Eschatological Expectation." Religions. 8.3 (March 2017), 1-15.
- Lewis, Stephen E. "Mysterious Heart: Maritain, Mauriac, Chrétien, and O’Connor on the Fictional Knowledge of Others." In Revelation and Convergence: Flannery O'Connor and the Catholic Intellectual Tradition, 78-98. Edited by Mark Bosco and Brent Little. Washington, D.C.: Catholic University of America Press, 2017. ISBN 978-0813229423
- Aspray, Silvianne. "An Augustinian response to Jean-Louis Chrétien’s phenomenology of prayer." International Journal of Philosophy and Theology. 79.3 (2018), 311-322.
- Benjamins, Jacob. "Listening in the Night: Jean-Louis Chrétien’s Critique of Martin Heidegger." Louvain Studies. 41.1 (2018), 19-37.
- DeLay, Steven. "Jean-Louis Chrétien: The Call and the Response." In Phenomenology in France: A Philosophical and Theological Introduction, 120-144. New York: Routledge, 2019. ISBN 978-1138244962
- Alvis, Jason W. "Faith and Forgetfulness: Homo Religiosus, Jean-Louis Chrétien, and Heidegger." Religions. 10.4 (2019), 264ff.
- Troutner, Timothy. "Jean-Louis Chrétien's Wounded Word." Church Life Journal. (5 July 2019).
- Stringer, Clifton. "Reduction to the Triune LORD in the Phenomenology of Jean‐Louis Chrétien: A Bonaventurean Appearance After Husserl." Modern Theology. 35.2 (2019), 223-243.
- Troutner, Timothy. "Recovering Fragility: Jean-Louis Chrétien on the Human Condition." Macrina Magazine. Issue 7 (10 April 2021).
- Troutner, Timothy. "Fragility, Amplified: The Contribution of the Latin Fathers to the Philosophy of Finitude." Church Life Journal. (23 April 2021).
- Peruzzotti, Francesca. "Human Spirituality: Jean-Louis Chrétien and the Vital Side of Speech." Religions. 12.7 (2021), 511ff.
- Shamel, Andrew. "Participation in God's Love: Revisiting John Milbank's ‘Out-Narration’ in the Light of Jean-Louis Chrétien and the Song of Songs." The Heythrop Journal. (12 December 2022).
- Breedlove, Thomas. "Being Wounded: Finitude and the Infinite in Jean Louis Chrétien and Gregory of Nyssa." Modern Theology. (19 January 2023).
- Bloechl, Jeffrey, ed. The Thought of Jean-Louis Chrétien: Phenomenology, Fragility, and Excess. (Lanham, MD: Rowman & Littlefield, 2023). ISBN 978-1538153215
- Gonzales, Philip, and Joseph McMeans, eds. Finitude’s Wounded Praise: Responses to Jean-Louis Chrétien. (Eugene, OR: Cascade, 2023). ISBN 978-1666710489
- Breedlove, Thomas. "The Touch of Desire: Woundedness and Desire in James Baldwin and Jean-Louis Chrétien." In Art, Desire, and God: Phenomenological Perspectives, 131-145. Edited by Christopher C. Rios, Kevin G. Grove, and Taylor J. Nutter. New York: Bloomsbury Academic, 2023. ISBN 978-1350327160
