= Alain de Libera =

French philosopher, historian, and translator

- Born: September 27, 1948 (age 78); Neuilly-sur-Seine
- Occupations: Philosopher, translator

Education
- Education: Lycée Pasteur (Neuilly-sur-Seine)
- Academic advisor: Pierre Hadot at CNRS

Philosophical work
- Era: Contemporary philosophy
- Region: Western philosophy
- Institutions: École normale d’instituteurs de Quimper; Collège de France (professor); École pratique des hautes études British Academy (fellow)
- Doctoral students: Jean-Baptiste Brenet
- Main interests: History of Philosophy; Medieval philosophy Classical Arabic; Latin; Averroes; Philosophy of mind Metaphysics

Alain de Libera (born 27 September 1948) is a French philosopher and translator interested primarily in Averroes and medieval philosophy.

== Education and career ==
De Libera was born on 27 September 1948 in Neuilly-sur-Seine, a northwestern suburb of Paris. He studied at the Lycée Pasteur in Neuilly-sur-Seine where he completed the baccalauréat in 1971. He achieved the Agregation in Philosophy from the Sorbonne in 1972. He began teaching educational psychology at the École normale d’instituteurs (teaching college) in Quimper.

He entered the French National Centre for Scientific Research (CNRS) in 1975 as a research associate under the direction of Pierre Hadot, then joined the École pratique des hautes études (EPHE) as a research fellow in the 5th section of Religious Sciences.

Alain de Libera was promoted to Director of studies in the history of Christian theologies in the Medieval West. The position was formerly denominated as director of the history of doctrines and dogmas (held by Étienne Gilson), and then the history of medieval theologies (held by Paul Vignaux and René Roques) prior to its conception at the time of Libera's tenure. In 1997, he was appointed full professor—on secondment to the University of Geneva—to a chair in the History of Medieval Philosophy. In 2012, he was elected as a professor at the Collège de France, where he held a chair in the History of Medieval Philosophy until 2019. He is also a Fellow of the British Academy since 2012.

Over the course of his career, he has taught as lecturer, then associate professor at a number of institutions: Paris-Nanterre University, École normale supérieure, University of Padua, Universities of Fribourg and Neuchâtel in Switzerland, the Italian University of Lugano, and the State University of Rio de Janeiro. He was a guest professor at the University of Moscow and the Franco-Russian College at the University of Saint Petersburg. He has held the Francqui Chair for Foreigners (1993–1994, University of Liège, Belgium), the Cardinal-Mercier Chair (1997, Faculty of Philosophy, Catholic University of Louvain), the Étienne Gilson Chair (2000, Catholic Institute of Paris), the Perelmann Chair (2010, Free University of Brussels), the Guest Professor for French Literature and Culture (2012, Swiss Federal Institute of Technology in Zurich.)

== Editorial work ==
He co-directed the "Études de philosophie médiévale" series (founded by Étienne Gilson) and subsequently the "Sic et non" series at Librairie philosophique J. Vrin. He later co-directed the "Vestigia" series at Éditions du Cerf and became an editorial consultant for the New Synthese Historical Library at Kluwer Academic Publishers (Dordrecht/Boston/London). A member of the editorial board of the Archives d’histoire littéraire et doctrinale du Moyen Âge, he co-directed the "Des travaux" series at Éditions du Seuil and became a member of the editorial board of the Revue de métaphysique et de morale, followed by the editorial board of Critique.

== Reception ==
=== Penser au Moyen Âge ===
According to philosopher Frédéric Nef, "The title of Penser au Moyen Âge (in English: "Thinking about the Middle Ages") articulates the ambiguity of its agenda: the author—a medievalist and historian of philosophy—seeks to reflect on our attitude toward the Middle Ages and to trace the conditions that gave rise to what is termed the 'experience of thought' in the 13th century. This period centered on the condemnations of 1277, which marked the Church's determination to oppose an overly radical Aristotelianism—specifically, the notion that human beatitude could be attained through the philosophical life." According to the author, the work aims to rethink the intellectual's position in contemporary society and the Western relationship with thought, while also shedding caricatures of medieval obscurantism.

=== The "Aristotle at Mont-Saint-Michel" Affair ===
Alain de Libera was a key figure in the controversy pitting a group of 56 academics (including Philippe Büttgen, Marwan Rashed, and Irène Rosier-Catach) and other researchers against one another in the "Aristotle at Mont-Saint-Michel" affair -a fierce dispute regarding the Arab-Muslim world's contribution to the West, sparked by the publication of the book of the same name by Sylvain Gouguenheim. In the realm of academic analysis, the main criticisms leveled at Gouguenheim's work are set out in the collective volume Les Grecs, les Arabes et Nous (The Greeks, the Arabs, and Us.) Journalist and essayist Jean Sévillia criticized the ideological and political approach he attributes to Alain de Libera—an approach he deems evident from certain statements, such as when the latter wrote, regarding the underlying Islamophobia in Gouguenheim's work: "That Europe is not mine; I leave it to the 'Ministry of Immigration and National Identity' and the cellars of the Vatican."

== Selected publications ==
=== Books ===
- Introduction à la mystique rhénane : d'Albert le Grand à Maître Eckhart, Paris: OEIL, 1984.
- La Philosophie médiévale, Paris: PUF, "Que sais-je ?" series, 1989. ISBN 2-13-051580-0.
- Albert le Grand et la philosophie, Paris: Librairie philosophique J. Vrin, 1990. ISBN 2-7116-1015-2.
- Averroès et l'averroïsme, Paris: PUF, "Que sais-je ?" series, 1991. ISBN 2-13-044203-X.
- La Philosophie médiévale, Paris: PUF, "Premier cycle" series, 1994. ISBN 2-13-046000-3.
- La Mystique rhénane. D'Albert le Grand à Maître Eckhart, Paris: Éditions du Seuil, "Points" series, 1994. ISBN 2-02-021112-2.
- Penser au Moyen Âge, Paris: Éditions du Seuil, 1991 ISBN 2-02-013199-4; "Points" series, 1996.
- La Querelle des universaux, de Platon à la fin du Moyen Âge, Paris: Éditions du Seuil, 1996. ISBN 2-02-024756-9.
- Eckhart, Suso, Tauler, ou la Divinisation de l'homme, Paris: Bayard Presse, 1996. ISBN 2-227-32508-9.
- Maître Eckhart et la Mystique rhénane, Paris: Éditions du Cerf, 1999. ISBN 2-204-05981-1.
- L'Art des généralités. Théories de l'abstraction, Paris: Éditions Aubier-Montaigne, 1999. ISBN 2-7007-3355-X.
- Morgen Schtarbe (novel), Paris: Flammarion, 1999.
- La Référence vide. Théories de la proposition, Paris: PUF, 2002. ISBN 2-13-051619-X.
- Raison et Foi. Archéologie d'une crise, d'Albert le Grand à Jean-Paul II, Paris: Éditions du Seuil, 2003. ISBN 2-02-061287-9.
- Thomas d'Aquin. L'Unité de l'intellect contre les averroïstes, Paris: Librairie philosophique J. Vrin, 2004. ISBN 2-7116-1681-9.
- Métaphysique et noétique. Albert le Grand, Paris: Librairie philosophique J. Vrin, 2005. ISBN 2-7116-1638-X.
- Archéologie du sujet. I. Naissance du sujet, Paris: Librairie philosophique J. Vrin, 2007. ISBN 978-2-7116-1927-6.
- Archéologie du sujet. II. La Quête de l'identité, Paris: Librairie philosophique J. Vrin, 2008. ISBN 2-7116-1974-5.
- Archéologie du sujet III. La double révolution. L'acte de penser, 1, Paris: Librairie philosophique J. Vrin, 2014. ISBN 978-2-7116-2610-6.
- Après la métaphysique : Augustin?, Paris: Librairie philosophique J. Vrin, 2013. ISBN 978-2-7116-2424-9.
- Où va la philosophie médiévale ?, Paris: Librairie Arthème Fayard / Collège de France, 2014.
- L'invention du sujet moderne, Paris: Librairie philosophique J. Vrin, 2015. ISBN 978-2-7116-1927-6.
- L’archéologie philosophique, Paris: Librairie philosophique J. Vrin, 2016. ISBN 978-2-7116-2741-7.
- La volonté et l’action, Paris: Librairie philosophique J. Vrin, 2017. ISBN 978-2-7116-2803-2.
- Le sujet de la passion, Paris: Librairie philosophique J. Vrin, 2020. ISBN 978-2-7116-2962-6.

=== Co-edited volumes ===
- Maître Eckhart. Métaphysique du Verbe et théologie négative (ed.), Paris: Éditions Beauchesne, 1997. ISBN 2-7010-1072-1.
- Dictionnaire du Moyen Âge (ed.), Paris: PUF, 1st ed., 2002. ISBN 2-13-053057-5.
- Les Grecs, les Arabes et nous : enquête sur l'islamophobie savante (ed.), Paris: Éditions Fayard, 2010. ISBN 978-2-213-65138-5.

=== Translations and critical editions ===
- Porphyry, Isagoge; Greek and Latin texts, translated by Alain de Libera and Alain Philippe Segonds, Paris: Librairie philosophique J. Vrin, 1998 (Sic et non), Clxii-100p. ISBN 2-7116-1344-5.
- Averroes, L'Intelligence et la Pensée, Paris: GF-Flammarion, 1999.
- Averroes, Decisive Discourse, trans. M. Geoffroy, introduction by Alain de Libera, Paris: GF-Flammarion, 1999.
- Thomas Aquinas, Contre Averroès, Paris: GF-Flammarion, 1999.
- Meister Eckhart, Traités et sermons, Paris: GF-Flammarion, 1999.

=== Honours ===
- Officer of the National Order of Merit (2010; Knight in 2005);
- Officer of the Order of Academic Palms (2025; Knight in 2006
