= Critical historiography =

Critical historiography approaches the history of art, literature or architecture from a critical theory perspective. Critical historiography is used by various scholars in recent decades to emphasize the ambiguous relationship between the past and the writing of history. Specifically, it is used as a method by which one understands the past and can be applied in various fields of academic work. si

== Concept ==
While historiography is concerned with the theory and history of historical writing, including the study of the developmental trajectory of history as a discipline, critical historiography addresses how historians or historical authors have been influenced by their own groups and loyalties. Here, there is an assumption that historical sources should not be taken at face value and has to be examined critically according to scholarly criteria. A critique of historiography warns against a tendency to focus on past greatness so that it opposes the present as demonstrated in the emphasis on dead traditions that paralyze present life. This view holds that critical historiography can also condemn the past and reveal the effects of repression and mistaken possibilities, among others. For instance, there is the case of the counter discourse to the so-called hegemonic epistemologies that previously defined and dominated the Black experience in America.

Some authors trace the origin of this field in nineteenth-century Germany, particularly with Leopold von Ranke, one of the proponents of the concept of Wissenschaft, which means "critical history" or "scientific history", which viewed historiography as a rigorous, critical inquiry. For instance, in the application of Wissenschaft to the study of Judaism, it is maintained that there is an implied criticism of the stand of those advocating Orthodoxy. It is said to reveal the tendency of nationalist historians to favor the pious affirmation of the orthodox in attempts to restore pride in Jewish history.

A type of critical historiography can be seen in the work of Harold Bloom. In Map of Misreading, Bloom argued that poets should not be seen as autonomous agents of creativity, but rather as part of a history that transcends their own production and that to a large degree gives it shape. The historian can try to stabilize poetic production so as to better understand the work of art, but can never completely extract the historical subject from history.

Also among those who argue for the primacy of historiography is the architectural historian Mark Jarzombek. The focus of this work is on disciplinary production rather than poetic production, as was the case with Bloom. Since psychology – which became a more or less official science in the 1880s – is now so pervasive, Jarzombek argued, but yet so difficult to pinpoint, the traditional dualism of subjectivity and objectivity has become not only highly ambiguous, but also the site of a complex negotiation that needs to take place between the historian and the discipline. The issue, for Jarzombek, is particular poignant in the fields of art and architectural history, the principal subject of the book.

Pierre Nora's notion of "ego-histories" also moves in the direction of critical historiography due to its interest in the ambiguous relationship between the present, the past, and the writing of history as well as the interactions of the fields of history, literary studies, and anthropology. The idea of these "ego-histories" is to bring into focus the relationship between the personality of historians and their life choices in the process of writing of history. The goal is to obtain the link between the history produced by the historian and the history of which he is a product. It is also proposed that, in architecture, critical historiography involves a strategic choice to approach the position of architecture within the given Symbolic order. This is demonstrated in the way Kenneth Frampton and Manfredo Tafuri associated Marxism with the Frankfurt School's critical theory.

A critique of critical historiography cites the risk of judging the realities of the past by the yardstick of what is true in the present so that it becomes illusory and can obscure identity.
