= Jean-Baptiste Brenet =

French philosopher, historian, and translator

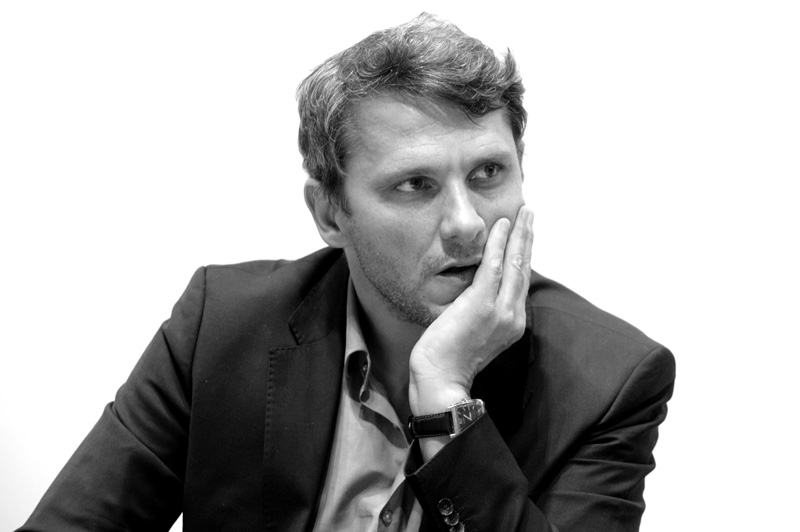
- Born: January 25, 1972 (age 54); Marseille
- Occupation: Philosophy professor

Education
- Education: Lycée Thiers, Marseille; Lycée Henri IV, Paris
- Alma mater: École pratique des hautes études
- Thesis: Transfers of the subject : Averroes' noetics by John of Jandun (2002)
- Doctoral advisor: Alain de Libera

Philosophical work
- Institutions: Paris Nanterre University; Paris 1 Panthéon-Sorbonne University; GRAMATA Centre; SPHère
- Main interests: History of Philosophy; Medieval philosophy Classical Arabic; Latin; Averroes; Philosophy of mind Medieval metaphysics
- Notable works: Le Dehors dedans. Averroès en peinture (Macula, 2025); Que veut dire penser ? Arabes et latins (Rivages, 2022)

Jean-Baptiste Brenet is a French philosopher and historian of philosophy specializing in medieval Arabic and Latin thought, particularly the work and reception of Averroes.

== Education ==
Brenet attended school at Lycée Thiers in Marseille, then Lycée Henri IV in the 5th arrondissement of Paris.

Brenet is an agrégé in philosophy (1995).

He holds a doctorate from l'École pratique des hautes études, 5th section, for which he wrote a thesis completed in 2002 under the direction of Alain de Libera and titled: Transferts du sujet. La noétique d'Averroès selon Jean de Jandun.

In 2010, he completed his Habilitation to supervise research at the same institution, with Alain de Libera as guarantor. His habilitation was titled Averroès et la scolastique latine: Études d’histoire des philosophies médiévales arabe et latine.

In 2006, he also received a certificat supérieur in Arabic studies from the Catholic University of Paris.

== Academic career ==
After obtaining his master’s degree in 1997, and while completing his doctorate and habilitation, he taught philosophy to secondary-school students in the classe terminale.

From 2000 to 2002, he was seconded as a research fellow to the Centre d’études des religions du Livre of the CNRS in Villejuif.

He was appointed lecturer at Paris Nanterre University in 2003 and remained there until 2011, when he became a professor at Paris 1 Panthéon-Sorbonne University, where he has been teaching ever since. There, he directed the GRAMATA Centre (Research Group on Antiquity, the Middle Ages and Arabic Translation). He is a member of the SPHère research laboratory.

== Scholarship ==
Brenet translates philosophical works from Arabic and Latin. With Christoph Grellard, he co-founded and co-edits Translatio. Philosophies médiévales, a series published by Librairie philosophique J. Vrin. He also created and hosts “falsafa” a series of meetings (the Arabic Philosophy Rendezvous) devoted to Arabic philosophy at the Institut du monde arabe (Arabic World Institute.)

Brenet’s research focuses principally on Averroes [Ibn Rushd (1126–1198)] as well as Andalusian philosophy.

He studies them both to understand the main concepts of "falsafa," particularly as they relate to metaphysics, anthropology, and philosophy of mind as well as the transmission of this "Arab" philosophy in Latin thought, and more broadly in modern European thought.

The core idea that underpins his work is that European modernity, contrary to conventional thought, does not begin with the Enlightment, but with the philosophies formed in ancient societies. In the presentation for his book Que veut dire penser? Arabes et Latins (Rivages, 2022), Brenet challenges the conventional account of European modernity as beginning with Descartes, arguing that it obscures earlier Arabic and Latin traditions of thought. Drawing on Aristotle’s comparison of the intellect to the hand as an “instrument of instruments,” (Note: He uses these words in an interview with journalist Anastasia Vécrin as well see Referenceas his own article for Libération. See also note (a). See References: Vécrin, 2023 and Brenet, 2024.) he describes thought as plural and composite—“a tool made of tools, a word filled with words.” His intention, therefore, is to "philosophize in order not to let the darkness prevail." (Note: This is the title of his article in Libération: Philosopher pour ne pas laisser gagner la noirceur, 15 June 2024, where he begins with a contemplation of contrast and proceeds to make the case for philosophy as the means by which we might discover what time has obscured.)

== Awards and distinctions ==
His translation of L’Intellect: Compendium du livre De l’âme, by Averroes (Vrin, 2022) won the Ibn Khaldoun–Léopold Sédar Senghor Prize for Translation.

In 2023, he was decorated by the French Ministry of Culture with the rank of chevalière (chevalier, or knight) in the Ordre des Arts et des Lettres. In the same year, he won the essay prize from Les Rencontres Philosophiques de Monaco (PhiloMonaco) for his work, Que veut dire penser ? Arabes et latins published in 2022 by Rivages.

In 2025, he won the Prix Biguet from the Académie Française for his work, Le Dehors dedans. Averroès en peinture (Macula, 2025).

== Selected works ==
=== Translations ===
- 1998: William of Auvergne, De l’âme, VII, 1–9. Paris: Vrin. ISBN 978-2-71161-368-7.
- 2010: Thomas Aquinas, Les Créatures spirituelles. Introduction, translation, and notes by Brenet. Paris: Vrin. ISBN 978-2-71162-266-5.
- 2013: Thomas Wylton, L’âme intellective. Berlin: De Gruyter. ISBN 978-3-11031-517-2.
- 2016: Thomas Aquinas, L’Âme et le Corps: Somme de théologie, Ia, q. 75–76. Translation and notes by Brenet; introduction by Bernardo Carlos Bazán. Paris: Vrin. ISBN 978-2-71162-688-5.
- 2018: Avicenna, Épître sur les prophéties. Introduction by Brenet and O. Lizzini; translated from Arabic and annotated by Brenet. Paris: Librairie philosophique J. Vrin. ISBN 978-2-71162-774-5.
- 2021: Ibn Tufayl, Le Philosophe sans maître. Edition of the translation by Étienne-Marc Quatremère, with a preface and notes by Brenet. Paris: Payot & Rivages.
- 2022: Averroes, L’Intellect: Compendium du livre De l’âme. Arabic text established and presented by D. Wirmer; introduction, translation, and notes by Brenet. Paris: Vrin. Recipient of the Ibn Khaldoun–Léopold Sédar Senghor Prize for Translation.
- 2023: Averroes, Dieu et la connaissance du monde. Paris: Payot & Rivages.
- 2024: A dossier of Brenet’s translations from medieval Latin authors, including Bonaventure, Thomas Aquinas, Siger of Brabant, Étienne Tempier, Giles of Rome, and Thaddeus of Parma, included in Le dehors dedans: Averroès en peinture. Paris: Macula.

=== Books ===
- 2003: Transferts du sujet: La noétique d’Averroes selon Jean de Jandun. Paris: Vrin. ISBN 978-2-71161-653-4.
- 2013: Les Possibilités de jonction: Averroès–Thomas Wylton. Berlin: De Gruyter. ISBN 978-3-11031-517-2.
- 2015: Averroès l’inquiétant. Paris: Les Belles Lettres. ISBN 978-2-25144-533-5.
- 2017: Je fantasme: Averroès et l’espace potentiel. Lagrasse: Verdier. ISBN 978-2-86432-909-1.
- 2018: Intellect d’amour, with Giorgio Agamben. Lagrasse: Verdier.
- 2019: Dante et l’averroïsme, with Alain de Libera and Irène Rosier-Catach. Paris: Collège de France and Les Belles Lettres.
- 2020: Robinson de Guadix. Preface by Kamel Daoud. Lagrasse: Verdier.
- 2022: Que veut dire penser? Arabes et Latins. Paris: Payot & Rivages.
- 2023: Demain la veille. Lagrasse: Verdier.
- 2024: Le dehors dedans: Averroès en peinture. Paris: Macula.

=== Edited volumes ===
- 2007: Averroès et les averroïsmes juif et latin. Proceedings of an international conference held in Paris, 16–18 June 2005. Turnhout: Brepols. ISBN 978-2-50352-742-0.
- 2018: Sujet libre: Pour Alain de Libera, edited with Laurent Cesalli. Paris: Vrin.
- 2019: Studying Arabic Philosophy: Meaning, Limits and Challenges of a Modern Discipline, edited with Olga Lizzini. Paris: Librairie philosophique J. Vrin.

=== Selected articles ===
- “Perfection de la philosophie ou philosophe parfait? Jean de Jandun, lecteur d’Averroès.” Recherches de théologie et philosophie médiévales, vol. 68, no. 2, 2001, pp. 310–348.
- “Les sources et le sens de l’anti-averroïsme de Thomas de Strasbourg.” Revue des sciences philosophiques et théologiques, vol. 90, no. 4, 2006.
- “Ame Intellective, Âme Cogitative: Jean de Jandun et La Duplex Forma Propria de l’homme.” Vivarium 46, no. 3 (2008): 318–41.
- “Thomas d’Aquin pense-t-il? Retours sur Hic homo intelligit.” Revue des sciences philosophiques et théologiques, vol. 93, no. 2, 2009.
- “Sujet, objet, pensée personnelle: L’Anonyme de Giele contre Thomas d’Aquin.” Archives d’histoire doctrinale et littéraire du Moyen Âge, vol. 79, no. 1, 2012.
- “Siger de Brabant et la notion d’operans intrinsecum: Un coup de maître?” Revue des sciences philosophiques et théologiques, vol. 97, no. 1, 2013.
- “Pensée, dénomination extrinsèque et changement chez Averroès: Une lecture d’Aristote, Physique VII, 3.” Archives d’histoire doctrinale et littéraire du Moyen Âge, vol. 82, no. 1, 2015.
- “Averroès et l’intellect matériel diaphane remarques sur une analogie variable.” Recherches de Théologie et Philosophie Médiévales 85, no. 2 (2018): 261–84.
- “Métaphysique et politique « en intention seconde » : Jean de Jandun héritier d’Averroès et d’Alexandre d’Aphrodise." Archives d’histoire Doctrinale et Littéraire Du Moyen Age 85 (2018): 109–27.
- Philosopher pour ne pas laisser gagner la noirceur, by Jean-Baptiste Brenet. Libération. 15 June 2024.

== See also ==
- Averroism
- Averroes's theory of the unity of the intellect
- Transmission of the Greek Classics
- Islamic philosophy
