= Corine Pelluchon =

French philosopher

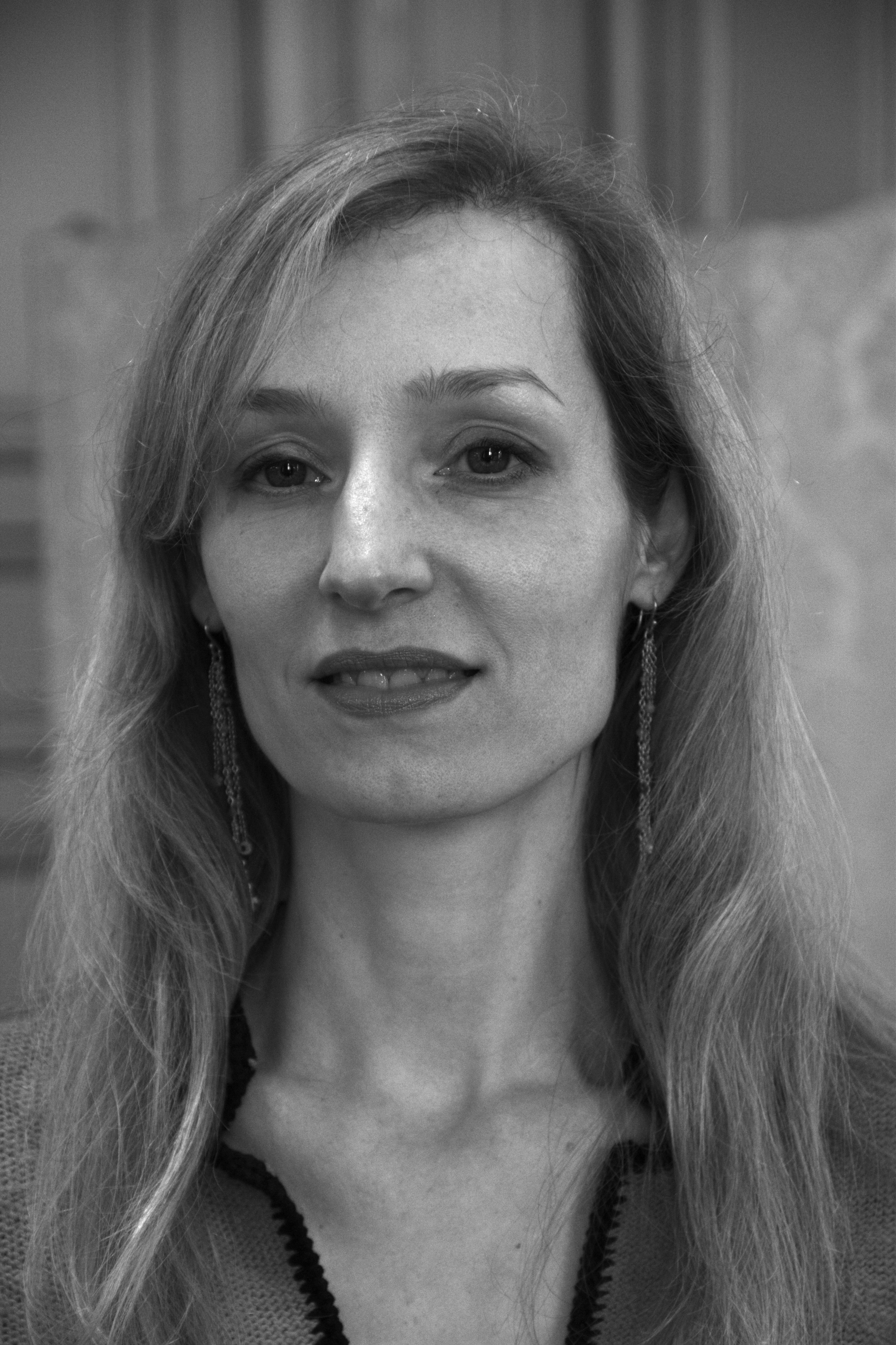
- Corine Pelluchon en 2013.
- Born: 2 November 1967
- Education: Paris 1 Panthéon-Sorbonne University
- Occupations: Philosopher; writer
- Awards: Prix Moron (2012); Chevalier of the Legion of Honour (2021)
- Scientific career
- Workplaces: Marie and Louis Pasteur University (2013–2016); Gustave Eiffel University (2016–); University of Poitiers (2008–2013)
- Doctoral advisor: Rémi Brague
- Doctoral students: Floran Augagneur
- Website: corine-pelluchon.fr

Corine Pelluchon (born 2 November 1967, Barbezieux-Saint-Hilaire) is a French philosopher and professor of philosophy at the University of Paris-Est Marne-la-Vallée (UPEM) which is now Gustave Eiffel University.

== Education ==
Corine Pelluchon received her agrégation in philosophy in 1997, then defended a thesis entitled La critique des Lumières modernes chez Leo Strauss at the Paris 1 Panthéon-Sorbonne University in 2003, and obtained a habilitation in philosophy entitled Bioéthique, écologie et philosophie politique : propositions pour un enrichissement de la philosophie du sujet in 2010.

== Career and research ==
She was appointed professor of philosophy at the University of Franche-Comté and in 2016 joined UPEM, where she is a statutory member of the interdisciplinary laboratory for the study of political philosopher, Hannah Arendt.

Pelluchon was invited by the parliamentary commission for the revision of the bioethics laws on 20 January 2009. She serves as a literary advisor for Alma éditeur, and was a member of the scientific council of the Fondation Nicolas-Hulot pour la nature et l'homme from 2017 to 2020.

Her research interests include applied ethics, medical ethics, animal issues, political ecology and environmental ethics.

== Awards and honours ==
- 2006, prix François-Furet
- 2012, prix Moron for her book, Éléments pour une éthique de la vulnérabilité. Les hommes, les animaux, la nature
- 2015, prix Édouard-Bonnefous for her book, Les Nourritures. Philosophie du corps politique
- 2016, prix Paris-Liège for the essay, Les Nourritures. Philosophie du corps politique
- 2020, prix Günther Anders
- 2021, Knight, Legion of Honour
- 2025, Leopold Lucas Preis

== Selected works ==
- La Flamme ivre, 1999 ISBN 2-220-04640-0
- Leo Strauss, une autre raison, d'autres Lumières : essai sur la crise de la rationalité contemporaine, 2005 ISBN 2-7116-1756-4
- Pelluchon, Corine (2009). L'Autonomie brisée. Bioéthique et philosophie. Léviathan. Paris. ISBN 978-2-13-057371-5.
- La Raison du sensible : entretiens autour de la bioéthique, 2009 ISBN 978-2-916053-59-2
- Éléments pour une éthique de la vulnérabilité : les hommes, les animaux, la nature, 2011 ISBN 978-2-204-08824-4
- Comment va Marianne ? : conte philosophique et républicain, 2012
- Tu ne tueras point : réflexions sur l'actualité de l'interdit du meurtre, 2013
- Les Nourritures : philosophie du corps politique, 2015 ISBN 978-2-02117-037-5
- Manifeste animaliste : politiser la cause animale, 2017 ISBN 978-2362792137
- Éthique de la considération, 2018 ISBN 9782021321609
- Pour comprendre Levinas, 2020 ISBN 978-2021442175
- Réparons le monde. Humains, animaux, nature, 2020 ISBN 2743649984
- Les Lumières à l'âge du vivant, 2021 ISBN 2021425010
- Paul Ricœur, philosophe de la reconstruction : Soin, attestation, justice, 2022 ISBN 9782130827207
- L'espérance ou la traversée de l'impossible, 2023 ISBN 9782743658472
- L'être et la mer. Pour un existentialisme écologique, 2024 ISBN 978-2-13-085043-4
- La démocratie sans emprise ou la puissance du féminin, Rivages, 2025 ISBN 9782743666200
- Merleau-Ponty à l’âge de l’anthropocène. (2025). Esprit, https://shs.cairn.info/revue-esprit-2025-3?lang=fr. Co-written with Étienne Bimbenet and Judith Revel for Revue Esprit. Kindle edition: ISBN 9782372343282.
- Transdeszendenz, Ökologie, Demokratie. Unsere Ressourcen im Angesicht von Krisen / Transdescendence, Ecology, Democracy. Our Resources in A Time of Upheaval. Edited by Birgit Weyel, in collaboration with Florian Zacher. Mohr Siebeck, Leopold Lucas Preis, Tübingen 2026, ISBN 978-3-16-200716-2. https://www.mohrsiebeck.com/buch/transdeszendenz-oekologie-demokratie-9783162007179/
