= École normale supérieure de lettres et sciences humaines =

Humanities-focused grande école in Lyon, France

Coordinates: 45°43′59″N 4°49′58″E

- Former names: École normale supérieure de Fontenay-Saint-Cloud
- Type: Public
- Active: 1987–2010
- Location: Paris between 1987 and 1999, Lyon between 2000 and 2009, France

The École normale supérieure lettres et sciences humaines (ENS LSH) was an elite French grande école specialising in the arts, humanities and social sciences. Founded in 1987 in Paris as the École normale supérieure de Fontenay-Saint-Cloud, it changed its name to ENS LSH in 2000 when it moved to Lyon. It was one of two Écoles normales supérieures (ENS) to be based in Lyon; the two came together in 2010 with the creation of the new École Normale Supérieure de Lyon.

== History ==
The ENS LSH had its origins in two Écoles normales supérieures that were founded in 1880 and 1882, located in Fontenay-aux-Roses (for female students, the École normale supérieure de Fontenay-aux-Roses) and in Saint-Cloud (for male students, the École normale supérieure de Saint-Cloud), both near Paris. In 1981, both became coed. As part of France's process of decentralisation, the scientific departments moved to Lyon in 1987, with the creation of the École Normale Supérieure de Lyon; humanities students remained in what was now called the ENS de Fontenay-Saint-Cloud in Paris. In 2000 this school was transferred to Lyon and took the public name of École Normale Supérieure Lettres et Sciences Humaines, also located in the Gerland district of Lyon's 7th arrondissement. The École Normale Supérieure Lettres et Sciences Humaines and the École Normale Supérieure de Lyon merged on 1st January 2010, retaining the name École Normale Supérieure de Lyon.

== Overview ==
The ENS LSH carried out teaching and research across a range of disciplines in the arts, humanities and social sciences, with teaching concentrated on final-year undergraduate, Masters and PhD levels, and research conducted through different research groups and centres, many organised in conjunction with the CNRS. Part of its mission was to train future university professors and researchers, as well as high school and classes préparatoires teachers, through preparation of students for the agrégation, France's highest-level teaching qualification. All of the ENS LSH's teaching and research programmes, as well as its international partnerships and other activities, were transferred in 2010 to the new École Normale Supérieure de Lyon.

== See also ==
- École normale supérieure
- École normale supérieure de Lyon
