= Estelle Ferrarese =

French philosopher

- Born: 1973
- Awards: PhiloMonaco Essay Prize (2026)

Education
- Education: Paris 8 University
- Thesis: Culture and public sphere : unvarying structures and inflexions in Jürgen Habermas' political theory (2000)
- Doctoral advisor: Jean-Marie Vincent

Philosophical work
- Era: Contemporary philosophy
- Region: Western philosophy
- School: Continental philosophy, critical theory
- Institutions: University of Picardy Jules Verne; Institut du Genre, CNRS
- Main interests: Political philosophy, moral philosophy, social philosophy, ethics of care

Estelle Ferrarese (born 1973) is a French philosopher and professor of moral and political philosophy at Picardie-Jules-Verne University in Amiens.

== Education, career, and distinctions ==
Her doctorate in political science was obtained in 2001 from Paris 8 University. Her thesis, "Culture and public sphere : unvarying structures and inflexions in Jürgen Habermas' political theory," was defended under the supervision of Jean-Marie Vincent. Her habilitation to direct research focused on vulnerability as a political object.

Ferrarese a Senior Member (since 2022) of the Institut Universitaire de France, She is a visiting professor at the New School for Social Research in New York City, as well as at Humboldt University in Berlin and at the University of Potsdam.

From 2015-2016, she was a research fellow at Centre Marc Bloch in Germany, which is affiliated with the French National Centre for Scientific Research (also known as the CNRS.) She was also a full professor at the University of Strasbourg. Currently, she is a professor of political and moral philosophy at University of Picardy Jules Verne.

An author of 14 books, her latest work, Une philosophie des sanglots, won the essay prize (2026) from Les Rencontres Philosophiques de Monaco.

== Research ==
She combines moral and political philosophy to study and write about the ethics of care and vulnerability. Drawing largely on Theodor W. Adorno and influenced by Sandra Laugier, her argument is that our understanding of how care is organized ought to be founded on the normative expectations and material conditions in a social context. Her work reflects the ideas of the Frankfort School on critical theory updated by feminism. To use her own words, from the translated abstract of a lecture she delivered at the Pontifical University of the Holy Cross in Rome, her work is anchored in critical theory and feminism, exploring the "Adornian critique of the notion of altruism." She is also concerned with the difficulties of translating the word "care" within the Latin languages.

== Selected works ==
=== Books ===
- The Market of Virtue: A Critique of Ethical Consumerism, Edinburgh University Press, 2026. 160p. Translated by Steven Corcoran.
- Une philosophie des sanglots, Payot & Rivages, 2025. ISBN 9782743665937.
- Le marché de la vertu: Critique de la consommation éthique, Librairie philosophique J. Vrin, 2023. ISBN 9782711631292.
- French: La fragilité du souci des autres, Librairie philosophique J. Vrin, 2018. ISBN 9782847889994.
  - English translation: The Fragility of Concern for Others: Adorno and the Ethics of Care, Edinburgh University Press, 2020. 160p. Translated by Steven Corcoran. ISBN 9781474467414.
- "Contemporary moral philosophy: three models of vulnerability." Care Ethics in Yet a Different Voice: Francophone Contributions (2020): 125-139. (ebook) ISBN 9789042940840.
- Vulnerability and Critical Theory. Brill Publishers, 2018. ISBN 9789004367906.
- The Politics of Vulnerability. (1st ed., ebook). Routledge, 2017. ISBN 9781351719551. Ferrarese edited the work and wrote the introduction, "Vulnerability: A concept with which to undo the world as it is?", a text that was originally published in Critical Horizons, 17:2, May 2016, pp.149-159. Other contributors to the work: Robert Castel, Veena Das, Penelope Deutscher, Sandra Laugier, Noémi Michel, and Alyson Cole.
- Ethique Et Politique de l’Espace Public: Jurgen Habermas Et La Discussion. Librairie philosophique J. Vrin, 2015.

=== Collaborative work ===
- With Alyson Cole: How Capitalism Forms Our Lives. Journal for Cultural Research; 2018; 22, pp. 105-12.
- With Nancy Fraser. Le féminisme en mouvements: des années 1960 à l'ère néolibérale. Paris: La Découverte, 2012. ISBN 9782707194534.
- With Sandra Laugier:
  - Formes de vie. Paris: CNRS Éditions, 2018.
  - "Politique des formes de vie." Raisons politiques, 2015/1 N° 57, 2015. p.5-12. Cairn.info.

=== Articles ===
- "Comment vivre de manière juste dans un monde mauvais ?" ("How can we live rightly in an unjust world?", Madame Figaro, 26 June 2026.
- "Emmanuel Macron traite l’exercice du pouvoir politique comme la résolution d’un casse-tête"]. Le Monde, 17 October 2025. link
- "La critique comme forme de vie démocratique." Multitudes 71, no. 2 (2018): 189-198.
- “Vulnerability: A Concept with Which to Undo the World As It Is?”] Critical Horizons 17 (2): 149–159. 2016. link
- "Nancy Fraser and the Theory of Participatory Parity". College de France: Books & Ideas. Translated by Nathalie Ferron. 14 September 2015.
- "Le projet politique d’une vie qui ne peut être séparée de sa forme. La politique de la soustraction de Giorgio Agamben." Presses de Sciences Politique; 2015; 1, pp. 49-63. link
- "Judith Butler’s ‘not particularly postmodern insight’ of recognition." Philosophy and Social Criticism 37 (7):759-773. link
- "“Gabba-Gabba, We Accept You, One of Us”: Vulnerability and Power in the Relationship of Recognition." Constellations: An International Journal of Critical & Democratic Theory 16, no. 4 (2009): 604. link
