= Raphaël Zagury-Orly =

Israeli-French philosopher

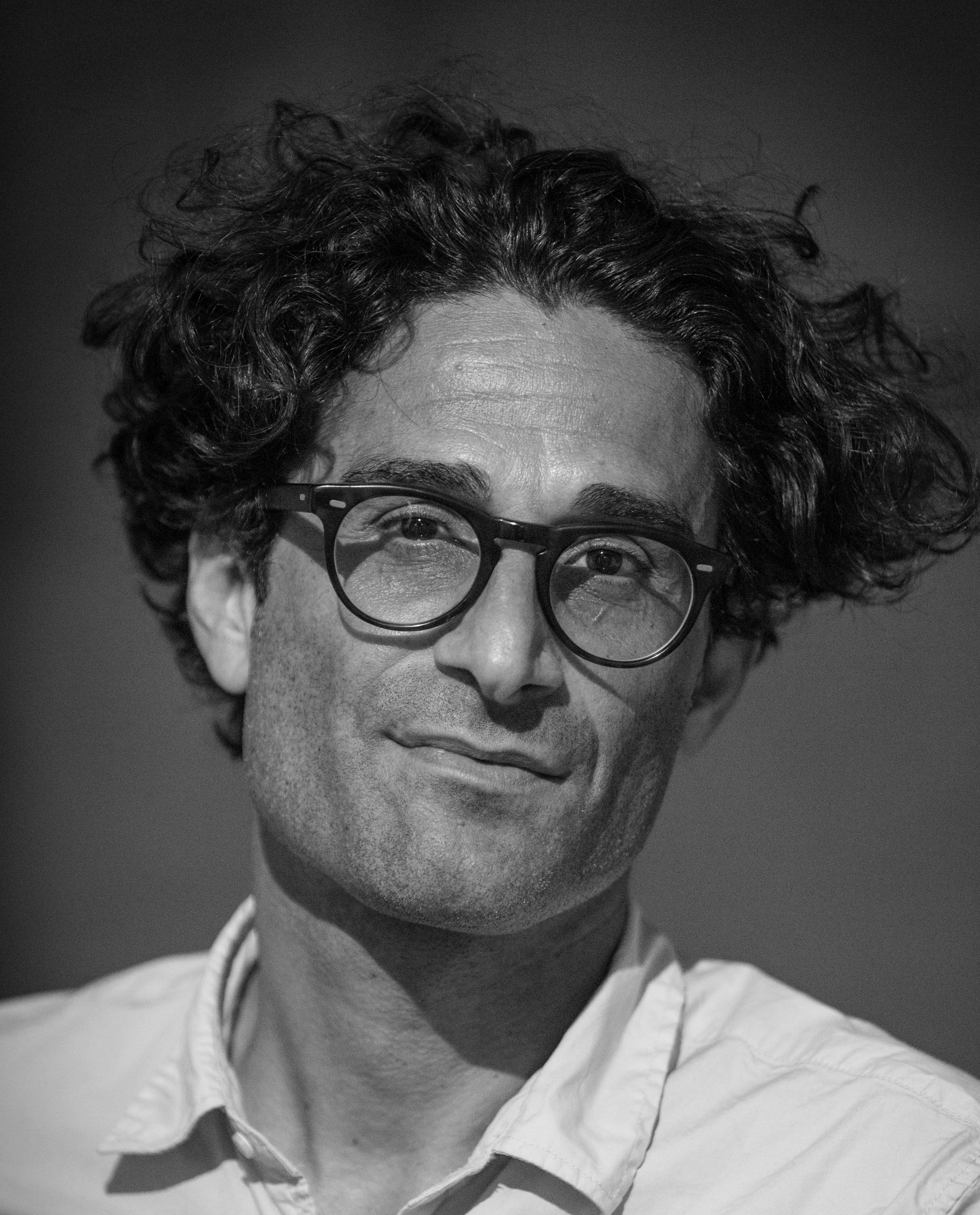
- Born: 1 November 1967 (age 59); Haifa, Israel

Education
- Education: University of Paris IV (PhD, 2002)
- Thesis: Le statut du criticisme dans le discours philosophique de la modernité : Kant face à Hegel et Heidegger (2002)
- Doctoral advisor: Alain Renaut
- Other advisor: Jacques Derrida

Philosophical work
- Era: Contemporary philosophy
- Region: Western philosophy
- Institutions: University of Heidelberg; Catholic University of Paris; Collège international de philosophie
- Main interests: German idealism, Jewish philosophy, phenomenology, aesthetics, metaphysics, history of philosophy

Raphaël Zagury-Orly (born 1 November 1967) is a Israeli-French philosopher. His work primarily focuses on German idealism, phenomenology, contemporary French philosophy, and Jewish Thought along the lines of Derrida deconstruction and ethical Lévinas thought.

== Education and career ==
He studied at the University of Paris IV from 1997 until 2002, then obtained his Ph.D. in Philosophy and Metaphysics. He defended his thesis under the direction of Alain Renault.

He is a visiting professor at l’Institut Catholique de Paris since 2019; associate member of the École des Hautes Études En Sciences Sociales, where his work focuses on the theory of contemporary art; and program director of the Collège International de Philosophie.

Since 2015, he has been a founding member at Les Rencontres Philosophiques de Monaco (PhiloMonaco).

Between 2003 and 2014, he was a professor of philosophy at the Bezalel Academy of Fine Arts and the director of the MFA program.

He held a research fellowship at the Asia and Europe in a Global Context Institute at the University of Heidelberg.

He was a visiting professor at the University of Rome at Sapienza from 2015 to 2016, at Karlsruhe University of Arts and Design from 2014 to 2015, and at École Doctorale de Sciences Po from 2016-2019.

"Since 2004, he has been Scientific Editor at the Resling Publishing House in Tel-Aviv, where he has supervised numerous Hebrew translations of Derrida, Deleuze, Bataille, Lyotard and Anders."

Since 2015, he has been the official curator for the Night of Philosophy in Tel Aviv. The Night of Philosophy is part of the local French Institute and works with the Arts program. Israeli and French intellectuals, totaling about one hundred people, meet to discuss philosophical topics.

Much of his work is collaborative, editorial, and translation from German and French into Hebrew. His translations include works by Jacques Derrida, Gilles Deleuze, Georges Bataille, Jean-François Lyotard, Günther Anders, Walter Benjamin, and Georges Didi-Huberman.

== Bibliography ==
=== Books edited ===
- With Isabelle Alfandary and Sandra Laugier, Où va la philosophie française ?, Paris: Librairie philosophique J. Vrin / Les Rencontres Philosophiques de Monaco, 2024. ISBN 9782711631827
- With Alain Fleischer, L'Humain qui vient, Paris: Éditions Hermann, 2024. ISBN 9791037040350.
  - Preface co-written by Zagury-Orly and Fleischer
  - Chapter 18: "L'humain qui vient – sans télos", pp. 173–183, written by Zagury-Orly.
- With Orietta Ombrosi, Derrida-Levinas: An Alliance Awaiting the Political, Milan: Mimesis Edizioni, 2018. ISBN 9788869771194
- With Joseph Cohen, Judéités: Questions pour Jacques Derrida, Paris: Éditions Galilée, 2003. ISBN 9782718605821.
  - English translation: Judeities: Questions for Jacques Derrida, edited by Bettina Bergo, Joseph Cohen, and Raphaël Zagury-Orly; translated by Bergo and Michael B. Smith, New York: Fordham University Press, 2007.
    - Chapter titled, "A Monster of Faithfulness," written by Cohen and Zagury-Orly

=== Chapters in books ===
- Oct. 7: À l'ombre de l'art / In the Shadow of Art. Ed. Delphine Horvilleur. Paris: Éditions Hermann, 2024. ISBN 9791037041357.
- With Joseph Cohen, To Live and Die in History, in After Life, ed. Rona Cohen & Ruth Ronen. Routledge, 2023. ISBN 9781003371557.
  - Published as a standalone book by Alibri Verlag, 2024. ISBN 9783865693969.
- With Joseph Cohen, "Anti-Judaism and Anti-Semitism in European Philosophy", in The Routledge Handbook of Philosophy and Europe, Routledge, 2021, p. 218. ISBN 9781317414520.

=== Books authored and co-authored ===
- Questionner encore, Paris: Éditions Galilée, 2011, 143 pp. ISBN 9782718608310.
- Le Dernier des sionistes, Paris: Les Liens qui Libèrent, 2021, 144 pp. ISBN 9791020909787.
- With Joseph Cohen, L'Adversaire privilégié. Heidegger, les juifs et nous, Paris: Éditions Galilée, 2021.
