= Isabelle Alfandary =

French philosopher, literary historian and psychoanalyst

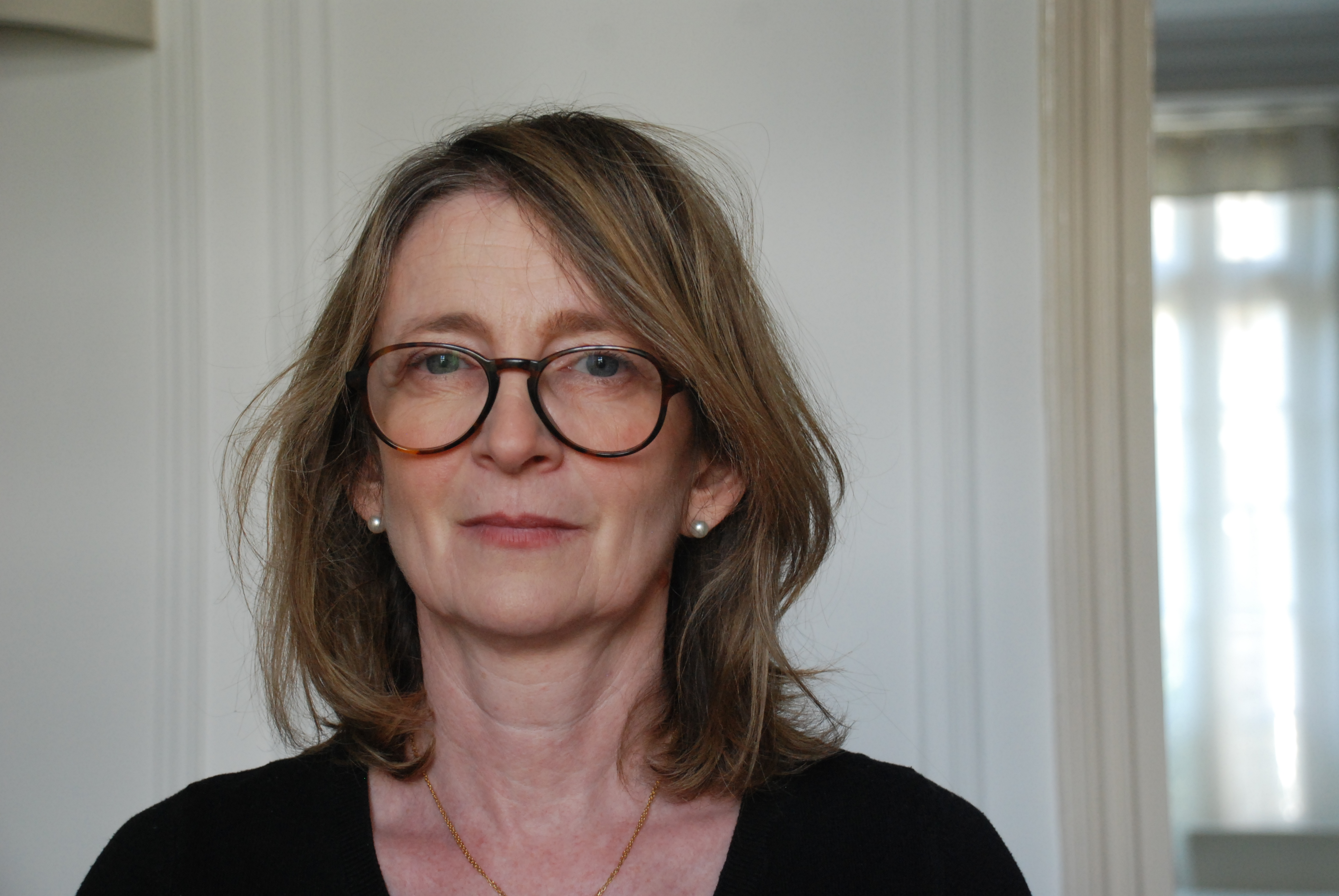
- Born: March 19, 1969 (age 57); Strasbourg

Education
- Education: Paris 3
- Thesis: The aesthetics of grammar in the poetry of e. E. Cummings (1999)
- Doctoral advisor: Marie-Christine Lemardeley

Philosophical work
- Era: Contemporary philosophy
- Region: Western philosophy
- Institutions: Paris 8 PhiloMonaco; European Graduate School; Northwestern
- Main interests: History of literature, psychoanalysis, deconstruction, Gender identity, Sexuality, Seduction
- Notable works: Le Scandale de la séduction (PUF, 2024)
- Website: Sorbonne Nouvelle - Paris 3 - Faculty Page

Isabelle Alfandary (born March 19, 1969) is a French academic, specializing in American literature, Contemporary philosophy, and psychoanalysis.

== Education and career ==
She completed her doctoral thesis in American literature in 1999, entitled, in French, "Esthétique de la grammaire dans l’œuvre d’E. E. Cummings," at Sorbonne Nouvelle University. She is a professor of American Literature and critical theory at Sorbonne Nouvelle University since 2013 and chair of the collegial assembly at the Collège international de philosophie.

She is a member of the awards jury at Les Rencontres Philosophiques de Monaco, which gives annual awards for philosophical works. She is the director of programs for psychoanalysis and philosophical at the Collège international de philosophie, where she is also former president (2013-2019). As a member of the French Scholars she co-founded the Northwestern University's Sorbonne Nouvelle Institute for Psychoanalysis. She is a professor at the European Graduate School.

From 1999-2006, she was a professor at Paris-Nanterre University. Then she joined the faculty at Lumière University Lyon 2, where she remained as professor until 2011. From 2011-2013, she taught at Paris-East Créteil University, where she also exercised the functions of vice-president of international affairs.

== Research and reception ==
She works notably on modern poetry, literature theory, and the lines between philosophy and psychanalysis, as well as questions about gender identity and sexuality.

Her book Le Scandale de la séduction (PUF, 2024) came out near the time of the Pelicot rape case in Mazan and is even more broadly treated in the context of the Me Too movement. In the book, Alfandary discusses how the contemporary movement exposed a longtime policy of silence, rooted in the Freudian coverup of sexual abuse confessed by his patients, which he initially believed but reversed later.

== Publications ==
=== Books ===
==== American literature ====
- E. E. Cummings ou la minuscule lyrique, Paris, Belin: 2002. ISBN 9782701131689.
- Le risque de la lettre : lectures de la poésie moderniste américaine, Lyon: ENS-éditions, 2012. ISBN 9782847886320.

==== Philosophy & psychoanalysis ====
- Derrida - Lacan : L’écriture entre psychanalyse et déconstruction, Paris: Éditions Hermann, 2016. ISBN 9782705692193.
- Science et fiction chez Freud. Quelle épistémologie pour la psychanalyse? Paris: Éditions Ithaque, 2021. ISBN 9782490350193.
- Le Scandale de la séduction. D'Œdipe à #Metoo, Paris: Presses universitaires de France, 2024. ISBN 9782130873082.

=== Editorial and collected works ===
==== Anglophone literature ====
- “VOICE AND SILENCE IN E. E. CUMMINGS’ POETRY.” Spring: A Journal of Archetype and Culture, no. 9 (2000): 36–43.
- Modernism and Unreadability, in collaboration with Axel Nesme, Montpellier, Presses Universitaires de la Méditerranée, 2011, 272p.
- Genre/genres I, in collaboration with Vincent Broqua. Paris: Michel Houdiard Éditeur, 2015, 149p.
- Genre/genres II, in collaboration with Charlotte Coffin and Vincent Broqua. Paris: Michel Houdiard éditeur, 2015, 193p.
- Literature and Error, in collaboration with Marc Porée. New York: Peter Lang, 2018, 262p.
- Stein et les arts, in collaboration with Vincent Broqua. Paris: Presses du Réel, 2019, 133p.

==== Philosophy, psychoanalysis & critical theory ====
- Lire depuis le Malaise dans la culture, in collaboration with Chantal Delourme and Richard Pedot. Paris, Éditions Hermann, 2012.
- L’Enigme Nietzsche, in collaboration with Marc Goldschmit. Paris: Manucius, 2019.
- Dialoguer l’archive, Paris, INA éditions, 2019
- La littérature sans condition, Paris: Le Bord de l’Eau, 2021.
- Crise dans la critique. Une cartographie des studies. Paris, Le Bord de l'Eau, 2023.<
- Qui a peur de la déconstruction ?, in collaboration with Anne-Emmanuelle Berger et Jacob Rogozinski: PUF, 2023. ISBN 9782130855309.
- Où va la philosophie française ?, in collaboration with Sandra Laugier and Raphaël Zagury-Orly, Librairie philosophique J. Vrin, 2024. (Note: Anne Simon (26 juin 2024). Isabelle Alfandary, Sandra Laugier et Raphaël Zagury-Orly dir. "Où va la philosophie française?" Paris: Vrin, 2024. PhilOfr. Consulté le 28 octobre 2024 à l’adresse https://doi.org/10.58079/11w5x)

== Honors & distinctions ==
- 1997-1998 : Fulbright scholar at Harvard University (Cambridge, Massachusetts) and University of Texas at Austin, TX
- 2009-2011 : Recipient of the France-Berkeley Fund grant for the project "Transatlantic Transactions: American Poetry and French Theory," in collaboration with Charles Altieri (University of California, Berkeley) and Axel Nesme (University of Lyon 2)
- 2011-2014 : Winner of the Partner University Fund (PUF) for the project "Transatlantic Transactions: French Theory and Twentieth Century American Poetry", also with Charles Altieri (University of California at Berkeley) and Axel Nesme (Lumière University Lyon 2)
