= Sandra Laugier =

French philosopher

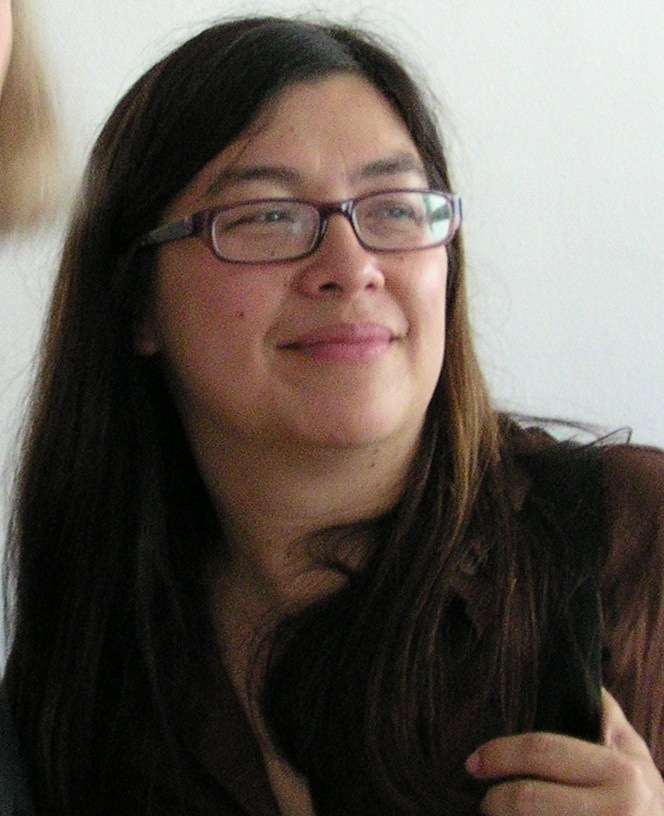
- Born: 1961 (age 64–65); Paris, France

Education
- Education: École Normale Supérieure; Harvard University; Paris-Sorbonne University; Pantheon-Sorbonne University
- Doctoral advisor: Maurice Clavelin
- Other advisor: Jacques Bouveresse

Philosophical work
- Era: 21st-century philosophy
- Region: Western philosophy
- School: Postanalytic philosophy, French feminism
- Institutions: University of Rennes 1 University of Picardy Jules Verne; Pantheon-Sorbonne University; Institut Universitaire de France
- Doctoral students: Manon Garcia; Tristan Garcia
- Main interests: Philosophy of language, moral philosophy, pragmatics, ethics of care
- Notable ideas: Politics of forms of life

Sandra Laugier (French: [loʒje]; born 1961) is a French philosopher, who works on moral philosophy, political philosophy, philosophy of language, gender studies, and popular culture.

== Education ==
Laugier received her Habilitation to Diriger des Recherches (direct research) (HDR) from the Panthéon-Sorbonne University in 1997 and her thesis from Paris-Sorbonne University in 1990. She was a visiting graduate student at Harvard University (1983-1985) and an undergraduate student at the Ecole Normale Supérieure, where she obtained an Agrégation in philosophy in 1983.

== Academic career ==
She is a full professor of philosophy (classe exceptionnelle, university professor) at the University of Paris 1 Panthéon-Sorbonne and a Senior Member of the Institut Universitaire de France. She currently serves as the deputy director of the Institut des sciences juridique et philosophique de la Sorbonne at Paris 1. Her work focuses on ethics of care, democracy, and feminism.

Laugier has held several positions at the Centre National de la Recherche Scientifique (CNRS), including deputy director of the Division for Humanities and Social Sciences (INSHS) from 2010 to 2017 and a Special Adviser “Science in Society” to the president of CNRS from 2016 to 2017.

One of the founders of the Institut du Genre at the CNRS, Laugier served as its president from 2012 to 2018 and as the president of the Scientific Council from 2018 to 2022. She has also served as an expert for the European Commission and as a panelist for the European Research Council (ERC).

=== Visiting professorships ===
Laugier has taught at various universities around the world, including as a visiting professor at Toronto University (2022), Boston University (2019) and at Sapienza University of Rome (2019), a visiting research fellow at the Max Planck Institute (Berlin), distinguished visiting professor at Johns Hopkins University, visiting professor at Pontifical University (Lima), and visiting professor “Chaire invitée” at the Facultés Saint-Louis (Bruxelles).

== Awards and distinctions ==
In 2014, she received the title of the Chevalier de la Légion d’honneur. In 2022, she was awarded the Grand Prix Moron by the Académie française. In 2024, she was elected to the American Philosophical Society.

== Published works ==
Laugier is the author of numerous publications on ordinary language philosophy (Ludwig Wittgenstein, John L. Austin), moral philosophy (moral perfectionism, ethics of care), American philosophy (Stanley Cavell, Henry David Thoreau, Ralph Waldo Emerson), gender studies, popular culture (TV series), and, more recently, on democracy and civil disobedience. She is the French translator of most of Stanley Cavell’s work and is one of his estate's executors.

Since 2019, she has been the principal investigator of the ERC programme Demoseries devoted to the philosophy of TV series.

=== Editorial work ===
Laugier is the editor of two-book series: TV-Philosophy, published by Exeter Press (with Robert Sinnerbrink and Martin Shuster) and Philoséries, published by Vrin (with Sylvie Allouche.)

She coedits, with Franck Fischbach the collection "Problèmes & Controverses" at the Librairie philosophique J. Vrin.

With Raphaël Zagury-Orly and Isabelle Alfandary, she co-directed a lecture series organized through Les Rencontres Philosophiques de Monaco: Qu’est-ce que la philosophie? ("What is philosophy?"). The text was published by Librairie philosophique J. Vrin.

She is a member of editorial / scientific board of:

- Archives de Philosophie
- British Journal for the History of Philosophy
- European Journal of Pragmatism and American Philosophy
- Iride
- Revue de Métaphysique et de Morale
- Multitudes (revue)

Additionally, she is a member of the scientific committee behind Vocabulaire européen des philosophies, dictionnaire des intraduisibles, edited by Barbara Cassin (Le Seuill/Le Robert, 2004).

She is also a member of the scientific council of "Citéphilo" (Lille), "PHILOSOPHIA" (St Emilion) and La fondation Maison des sciences de l'homme (FMSH) (Paris). Additionally, she serves as a member of the jury of the prizes given by Les Rencontres Philosophiques de Monaco.

Laugier is a columnist at the French journal Libération and is the author of about ten translations of the author Stanley Cavell.

==== Edited books ====
- Physique et réalité (coedited with Michel Bitbol), Paris, éditions Diderot, Paris, 1997
- Les mots de l’esprit: Wittgenstein et la philosophie de la psychologie (coedited with Christiane Chauviré and Jean-Jacques Rosat), Paris, Vrin, 2001
- Carnap et la construction logique du monde, Paris, Vrin, 2001
- Stanley Cavell, cinéma et philosophie (coedited with Marc Cerisuelo), Paris, Presses de la Sorbonne Nouvelle, 2001
- Wittgenstein: Métaphysique et jeu de langage, Paris, PUF, 2001
- Wittgenstein, dernières pensées (coedited with Jacques Bouveresse and Jean-Jacques Rosat), Marseille, Agone, 2002
- Husserl et Wittgenstein: De la description de l’expérience à la phénoménologie linguistique (coedited with Jocelyn Benoist), Hildesheim, Olms, 2004
- Textes-clés de philosophie des sciences (coedited with Pierre Wagner), 2 volumes, Paris, Vrin, 2004
- Langage ordinaire et métaphysique – Strawson (coedited with Jocelyn Benoist), Paris, Vrin, 2005
- Dictionnaire de la pornographie (coedited with Philippe Di Folco), Paris, PUF, 2005
- Le souci des autres – éthique et politique du care (coedited with Patricia Paperman), Paris, Éditions de l’EHESS, 2006
- L’ordinaire et le politique (coedited with Claude Gautier), Paris, PUF, 2006
- Ethique, littérature, vie humaine, Paris, PUF, 2006
- Lire les Recherches Philosophiques de Wittgenstein (coedited with Christiane Chauviré), Paris, Vrin, 2006
- Comment penser l'autonomie? Entre compétences et dépendances (coedited with Marlène Jouan), Paris, PUF, 2008
- Normativités du sens commun (coedited with Claude Gautier), Paris, PUF, 2009
- Textes-clés de philosophie du langage (coedited with Bruno Ambroise), 2 volumes, Paris, Vrin, 2009, 2010
- Qu’est-ce que le care ? (coedited with P. Paperman and P. Molinier), Payot, Paris, 2009.
- La voix et la vertu: Variétés du perfectionnisme moral, Paris, PUF, 2010
- J. L. Austin et la philosophie du langage ordinaire (coedited with Christophe Al-Saleh), Hildesheim, Olms, 2011
- Tous vulnérables? Ethique du care, les animaux et l'environnement, Paris, Payot, 2012
- La philosophie analytique (coedited with Sabine Plaud), Paris, Ellipses, 2012
- Philoséries: Buffy – Tueuse de vampires (coedited with Sylvie Allouche), Paris, Bragelonne, 2014
- Formes de vie (coedited with Estelle Ferrarese), CNRS éditions, 2018
- Le pouvoir des liens faibles (coedited with Alexandre Gefen), CNRS éditions, 2020
- Concepts de l’ordinaire (coedited with Pierre Fasula), éditions de la Sorbonne, 2021
- Perlocutoire (coedited with Daniele Lorenzini), éditions Mare et Martin, 2021
- Des enjeux publics de la pandémie (coedited with Christine Noiville and Xavier Philippe), éditions Mare et Martin, 2021
- Cavell’s Must We Mean What We Say? at Fifty (coedited with Juliet Floyd et Greg Chase), Cambridge University Press, 2022
- Les usages de l’usage (coedited with Béatrice Godart-Wendling), ISTE, Londres, 2022
- 24h chrono. Aux origines du genre sécuritaire (coedited with Sylvie Allouche), Vrin, open access, 2022
- Séries TV, laboratoire d’éveil politique, CNRS Editions, Paris 2023
- Television With Stanley Cavell in Mind (coedited with David LaRocca), Exeter Press, 2023

==== Edited special journal issues ====
- "Retour du moralisme ?" (coedited with Laurent Jaffro), Cités, 2001
- "Moritz Schlick et le tournant de la philosophie", Etudes Philosophiques, 2001
- "Wittgenstein 1889-1951", Archives de philosophie, 2001
- "Ralph Waldo Emerson: L’autorité du scepticisme", Revue Française d’Etudes Américaines, 2002
- "Naturalisme(s): Héritages contemporains de Hume", Revue de métaphysique et de morale, 2003
- "Politiques de la pornographie" (coedited with Michela Marzano), Cités, 2003
- "Après la structure: Kuhn et les révolutions scientifiques", Archives de philosophie, 2003
- "Usages d’Austin" (coedited with Isabelle Thomas-Fogiel), Revue de métaphysique et de morale, 2004
- "Morale et métaphysique chez G.E. Moore" (coedited with Emmanuel Picavet), Revue de métaphysique et de morale, 2006
- "La contrainte", Actes de savoirs. Revue de l'IUF, 2007
- "Quine et l'analyticité", Archives de philosophie, 2009
- "Wittgenstein politique" (coedited with Marie-Anne Lescourret), Cités, 2009
- "Politiques du care" (coedited with Pascale Molinier), Multitudes, 2009
- "Perfectionism, Transcendentalism, Pragmatism" (coedited with Piergiorgio Donatelli), European Journal of Pragmatism and American Philosophy, 2011
- "Grammaires de la vulnérabilité" (coedited with Marie Gaille), Raison Publique, 2011
- "Stanley Cavell", Revue internationale de philosophie, 2011
- "Le retour à la vie ordinaire", Raison Publique, 2013
- "Care and Human Security", Iride, 2013
- "Care, catastrophe, capabilités", Raison Publique, 2014
- "Nouveaux vivants" et "Le care des robots", Multitudes, 2015
- "Genre et environnement", Cahiers du Genre, 2015
- "Politique des formes de vie", with E. Ferrarese, Raisons politiques, 2015
- "New Robotics, New Living Beings", Iride, 2016
- "Scepticisme, pragmatisme et philosophie du langage ordinaire", with D. Zapero, Raison Publique, 2016.
- "L'invention des formes de vie", Multitudes, no 71, 2018
- "Symposia - Democrazia e scienze partecipative", Iride, no 3, 2019
- "The perlocutionary and the illocutionary", dir. with D. Lorenzini,Inquiry, 2019
- "Le patriarcat bouge encore", Multitudes, no 78, 2020
- "L’autre société des séries (with A. Kyrou)", Multitudes, no 84, 2021
- "Ethics and Politics of TV Series", Open Philosophy, 2021
- "100 ans de Tractatus logico-philosophicus", Revue internationale de philosophie, 2022
- "Les séries télévisées pensent-elles ?", Revue internationale de philosophie, 2022

=== Bibliography ===
==== Books ====
- L'Anthropologie logique de Quine, Paris, Vrin, 1992
- Recommencer la philosophie: La philosophie américaine aujourd'hui, Paris, PUF, 1999 (new enlarged edition, Vrin, 2014)
- Du réel à l'ordinaire: Quelle philosophie du langage aujourd'hui ?, Paris, Vrin, 1999 (translated in English, The University of Chicago Press, 2013)
- Faut-il encore écouter les intellectuels?, Paris, Bayard, 2003
- Une autre pensée politique américaine: La démocratie radicale, de R. W. Emerson à S. Cavell, Paris, Michel Houdiard, 2004
- Qu'est-ce que le care? (with Patricia Paperman and Pascale Molinier), Paris, Payot, 2009
- Wittgenstein: Les sens de l'usage, Paris, Vrin, 2009
- Wittgenstein: Le mythe de l’inexpressivité, Paris, Vrin, 2010
- Pourquoi désobéir en démocratie? (with Albert Ogien), Paris, La Découverte, 2010
- Why We Need Ordinary Language Philosophy, Chicago, The University of Chicago Press, 2013
- Face aux désastres: Une conversation à quatre voix sur la folie, le care et les grandes détresses collectives (with Anne M. Lovell, Stefania Pandolfo, Veena Das), Paris, Ithaque, 2013
- Le Principe démocratie (with Albert Ogien), Paris, La Découverte, 2014
- Recommencer la philosophie: Stanley Cavell et la philosophie en Amérique, Paris, Vrin, 2014
- Etica e politica dell'ordinario, Milano, LED Edizioni, 2015
- Antidémocratie, (with Albert Ogien), Paris, La Découverte, 2017
- with Estelle Ferrarese. Formes de vie. Canada, CNRS Éditions, 2018.
- Nos vies en series, Paris, Climats, 2019
- La société des vulnérables. Leçons féministes d’une crise (with Najat Vallaud-Belkacem), Paris, Éditions Gallimard, 2020
- Politics of the Ordinary. Care, Ethics, and Forms of Life, Leuven, Peeters, 2020
- Eloge de l’ordinaire, entretiens avec Philippe Petit, Le Cerf, 2021
- En confinement/La seconde vague des séries féministes, AOC livres, 2021
- Reinventer l’espace public (with Yves Cohen, Nilüfer Göle, and Richard Rechtman), CNRS Éditions, 2022
- TV-Philosophy: How TV Series Change Our Thinking, Exeter Press, 2023
- TV-Philosophy in Action: The Ethics and Politics of TV Series, Exeter Press, 2023

==== Translations ====
- S. Cavell, Une nouvelle Amérique encore inapprochable, de Wittgenstein à Emerson (This New Yet Unapproachable America), Combas, Éditions de l'éclat, 1991
- S. Cavell, Statuts d’Emerson: Constitution, philosophie, politique, the volume includes a presentation and translation of Cavell's and Emerson's essays, Combas, Éditions de l'éclat, 1992
- S. Cavell, A la recherche du bonheur: Hollywood et la comédie du remariage (Pursuits of Happiness), Paris, Cahiers du Cinéma, 1993 (with Christian Fournier)
- S. Cavell, Conditions nobles et ignobles: La constitution du perfectionnnisme moral émersonien (Conditions Handsome and Unhandsome), Combas, Éditions de l'éclat, 1993 (with Christian Fournier)
- S. Cavell, Les Voix de la raison (The Claim of Reason), Paris, Éditions du Seuil, 1996 (with Nicole Balso)
- A. Gibbard, Sagesse des choix, justesse des sentiments: Une théorie du judgement normatif (Wise Choices, Apt Feelings), Paris, PUF, 1996
- S. Cavell, Un ton pour la philosophie (A Pitch of Philosophy), Paris, Bayard, 2003 (with Elise Domenach)
- W. V. Quine, D’un point de vue logique (From a Logical Point of View), Paris, Vrin, 2003 (collective translation)
- R. W. Emerson, Essais: Histoire, Destin, Expérience, Compensation, Paris, Michel Houdiard, 2005 (with Christian Fournier)
- S. Cavell, Dire et vouloir dire (Must We Mean What We Say?), Paris, Éditions du Cerf, 2009 (with Christian Fournier)
- S. Cavell, Qu'est-ce que la philosophie américaine?, Paris, Folio Gallimard, 2009 (with Christian Fournier)
- S. Cavell, Si j'avais su… (Little Did I Know), Paris, Éditions du Cerf, 2014 (with Jean-Louis Laugier)
- S. Cavell, A la recherche du bonheur, Hollywood et la comédie du remariage (Pursuits of Happiness), Vrin, Paris, new edition, with a new presentation.
- S. Cavell, Here and There (ed. with N. Bauer and A. Crary), Harvard University Press, 2022
- S. Cavell, A la recherche de l’ordinaire, Vrin, forthcoming 2023

==== Articles ====
Her article, "Politics of vulnerability and responsibility for ordinary others," was published in Critical Horizons in May 2016 and then reprinted as Chapter 4 in The Politics of Vulnerability. (1st ed., ebook). Routledge, 2017. ISBN 9781351719551. Estelle Ferrarese edited the work and wrote the introduction. All texts in this work were previously published in Critical Horizons, 17:2, May 2016. Other contributors to the work: Robert Castel, Veena Das, Penelope Deutscher, Noémi Michel, and Alyson Cole.

- Selected publications and papers are available on the author's Academia page and HAL page
- Complete list of publications is available on the author's personal website
- Her recent publications and broadcasts are announced on the author's facebook page

==== Selected papers in English available online ====
- "Taking TV Series Seriously", Open Philosophy, volume 5, issue 1, 2022, pages 250–253. https://doi.org/10.1515/opphil-2022-0198
- "Series Under Threat", Open Philosophy, volume 5, issue 1, 2022, pages 155–167. https://doi.org/10.1515/opphil-2020-0165
- "Necrology of Ontology: Putnam, Ethics, Realism", The Monist, volume 103, issue 4, October 2020, pages 391–403
- "Disobedience as Resistance to Intellectual Conformity ", Critical Inquiry 45, 2019
- "The Vulnerabiliy of the Ordinary: Goffman, reader of Austin", 2018
- "Voice as Form of Life and Life Form", 2015
- "The Normativity of the Ordinary: Performative Utterances and Social Reality"
- "A Romanticism of Democracy: Emerson, Thoreau, Cavell, Malick"
- "Popular Cultures, Ordinary Criticism: A Philosophy of Minor Genres", MLN Journal | Johns Hopkins University Press, 2012
- "This is us. Wittgenstein and the social", 2012
- "Introduction to the French edition of Must We Mean What We Say?", Critical Inquiry, vol. 37 (2011), no. 4, pp. 627–651
- "The Will to See", Graduate Faculty Philosophy Journal, vol. 34 (2013), no. 2, pp. 263–281
- "The Ethics of Care as a Politics of the Ordinary"
- Interview with Sandra Laugier and Albert Ogien on civil disobedience
- Notes on Stanley Cavell
