= Penelope Deutscher =

American philosopher

- Born: 1966 (age 59–60)

Philosophical work
- Era: Contemporary philosophy
- Region: Western philosophy
- School: Continental
- Institutions: Northwestern University; Australian National University; University of New South Wales; University of Paris; Ruhr University Bochum
- Main interests: 20th-century French philosophy; Gender studies

Penelope Deutscher (born 1966) is an American professor of philosophy at Northwestern University whose work focuses on French philosophy from the 20th and 21st centuries and gender studies. She has written four books dealing with subjects ranging from gender and feminism to the works of Jacques Derrida, Luce Irigaray, and Simone de Beauvoir. In 2002–2003, Deutscher also served as the Lane Professor for the Humanities at the Alice Berline Kaplan Center for the Humanities at Northwestern University.

== Education and career ==
Deutscher received her bachelor's from the University of Sydney in 1986 and went on to receive a Diplôme des études approfondies at the University of Paris in 1991 and a doctorate in philosophy from the University of New South Wales in 1993. Deutscher served as an associate lecturer in philosophy at the University of New South Wales in 1992 before becoming a lecturer and then senior lecturer in philosophy at the Australian National University from 1992 to 2001. Deutscher moved to Northwestern University in 2002, accepting an appointment as the Lane Professor for the Humanities in 2002–2003, and then serving as an associate professor from 2002 to 2008 before being promoted to full professor in 2008. Besides for her permanent appointments, Deutscher also served as the Marie-Jahoda guest professor at Ruhr University Bochum in 2013.

== Publications ==
Deutscher has authored five books, including:

- Yielding Gender: Feminism, Deconstruction and the History of Philosophy (1997)
- A Politics of Impossible Difference: The Later Work of Luce Irigaray (2002), How to Read Derrida (2006)
- The Philosophy of Simone de Beauvoir: Ambiguity, Conversion, Resistance (2008)
- Foucault's Futures: A Critique of Reproductive Reason (2017).

Deutscher has also edited or co-edited four books:

- Repenser le politique: l'apport du féminisme (2004)
- Enigmas: Essays on Sarah Kofman (1999)
- (with Olivia Custer and Samir Haddad) Foucault/Derrida Fifty Years Later (2016)
- (with Cristina Lafont) Critical Theory in Critical Times (2017).

Deutscher has also written a large number of refereed articles, contributed more than 26 book chapters, several encyclopedia articles, and a number of book reviews. Her article, “On the Whole We Don’t:” Michel Foucault, Veena Das and Sexual Violence, was first printed in Critical Horizons (May 2016) and then reprinted as Chapter 3 in The Politics of Vulnerability. (1st ed., ebook). Routledge, 2017. ISBN 9781351719551. Estelle Ferrarese edited the work and wrote the introduction. All chapters in this book were previously published in Critical Horizons, 17:2, May 2016. Other contributors to the work: Robert Castel, Veena Das, Sandra Laugier, Noémi Michel, and Alyson Cole.

== Research topics ==
Deutscher's first book, Yielding Gender: Feminism, Deconstruction and the History of Philosophy, engaged the works of Judith Butler and Eve Sedgwick with that of Jacques Derrida to create a novel analysis of the instability of the meaning of woman throughout the history of philosophy. Deutscher's second book, A Politics of Impossible Difference: The Later Work of Luce Irigaray, provides a close reading of the work of Luce Irigaray, arguing that Irigaray's work stresses the importance of the value of difference, especially those differences that the hegemon is most interested in actively excluding. Deutscher's third book, How to Read Derrida, provides an introduction to the works of Jacques Derrida, focusing on his approach to deconstructionism. The Philosophy of Simone de Beauvoir: Ambiguity, Conversion, Resistance examines Beauvoir's style of building theory upon theory, arguing that building theories upon each other that simultaneously undermine each other does not diminish the significance or results of the study, and focuses in large part on two of Beauvoir's most significant concepts, sexual and generational alterity.
