= Robert Castel =

French sociologist

- Born: 1 August 1933; Saint-Pierre-Quilbignon, France
- Died: 12 March 2013 (aged 79); Paris, France
- Occupation: Sociologist

Robert Castel (1 August 1933 – 12 March 2013) was a French sociologist and researcher at the École des hautes études en sciences sociales.

== Academic career ==
Castel was born in Saint-Pierre-Quilbignon, now part of Brest. He initially studied philosophy in the late 1950s. In the late 1960s, he met Pierre Bourdieu and began working with him in sociology. His initial work dealt with psychology and psychiatry, establishing a critical sociology of these issues and linking this work to Michel Foucault, particularly to his 'genealogical approach'. He further dealt with exclusion, or rather what he called the 'disaffiliation', which affects individuals 'by default'.

His later and perhaps best known work examined how the wage system, which at first was despised, has gradually established itself as the reference model and has been progressively associated with social protections, and the concept of social property, creating a constitutive status of 'social identity'. Castel was responsible for the formation of Le Groupe d'analyse du social et de la sociabilité (GRASS), a specialised group of sociologists within the CNRS.

His article, The Rise of Uncertainties, was first printed in Critical Horizons (May 2016) and then reprinted as Chapter 1 in The Politics of Vulnerability. (1st ed., ebook). Routledge, 2017. ISBN 9781351719551. Estelle Ferrarese edited the work and wrote the introduction. All chapters in this book were previously published in Critical Horizons, 17:2, May 2016. Other contributors to the work: Veena Das, Sandra Laugier, Penelope Deutscher, Noémi Michel, and Alyson Cole.

== Books ==
- Le Psychanalysme, 1973
- L'Ordre psychiatrique, 1977 (Translated into English in 1988: The Regulation of Madness: The Origins of Incarceration in France)
- La Société psychiatrique avancée, 1979
- La Gestion des risques, Minuit, 1981
- Les Métamorphoses de la question sociale, une chronique du salariat, Fayard, 1995. (Translated into English in 2002: From Manual Workers to Wage Laborers: Transformation of the Social Question)
- Propriété privée, propriété sociale, propriété de soi (avec Claudine Haroche), 2001.
- L'Insécurité sociale : qu'est-ce qu'être protégé?, Éd. du Seuil, 2003.
- La discrimination négative, 2007
- La montée des incertitudes : Travail, protections, statut de l'individu, Ed. du Seuil, 2009
