= Alyson Cole =

American political scientist

- Education: University of California, Berkeley
- Known for: The Cult of True Victimhood (2007)
- Scientific career
- Fields: Political science; Women's studies; Gender studies; American studies
- Workplaces: Queens College, City University of New York; CUNY Graduate Center

Alyson M. Cole is an American political scientist. She is a professor of Political Science, Women's and Gender Studies, and American Studies at Queens College, City University of New York and the CUNY Graduate Center, where she has also served as the Executive Officer of the political science program. Cole studies political philosophy and American culture, and has published works on the politics of victimhood and vulnerability in America, the politics of gender equality, and the nature of capitalism as a way of life.

== Education ==
Cole holds a PhD from the University of California, Berkeley.

== Research ==
In 2007, Cole published her first book, The cult of true victimhood: from the war on welfare to the war on terror. The book builds on the study of the rhetoric of victimization in American politics, in which the notion of victim is viewed as a useful device for the political establishment to translate failures of the system into individual faults with some group of people. Early writers on this topic include the psychologist William Ryan. Cole studies competing claims to victimhood in contemporary American politics, particularly claims on either side of the culture wars that began in the 1980s and 1990s regarding welfare, feminism, racism, and eventually the war on terror that followed the September 11 attacks. The notion of victimhood maps naturally onto social groups because a particular set of people is claimed to be disadvantaged by the system, and it is politically salient because claims of victimhood often seek state remedies. Disagreements about victimhood can therefore cause inter-group conflicts through processes like identity politics. Cole argues that part of the source of this tension in the United States is the conflict between the idea of victimhood and the dominant American political culture: because liberal individualism is a fundamental virtue in American political identity, the notion of claiming to be a victim can be cast as pathetic and undeserving. Cole focuses on how "anti-victimist" figures like Charles Sykes, Robert Hughes, Shelby Steele, Alan Dershowitz and Dinesh D'Souza have used anti-victimhood rhetoric to undermine the credibility of those claiming to be victims of an unjust political system, which in turn positions those figures as victims of other peoples' professed victimhood. Conversely, Cole also studies the rejection of victimhood by some second-wave feminists, studying how authors like Naomi Wolf and Camille Paglia rejected the political tactic of identifying with victimhood as a means to accrue power by appearing powerless. Cole's study of victimhood has implications for understanding the right and left in American politics from the 1960s onwards, but primarily focuses on political disputes regarding multiculturalism, identity politics, and feminism during the 1990s, as well as how America was rhetorically cast as a victim to justify the country's response to the September 11 attacks. She also studies the implications of these rhetorical tools to policies including civil and criminal justice reform and the extent of the welfare state. In addition to The cult of true victimhood, Cole has also written about the political use of victimhood and vulnerability in peer-reviewed journal articles.

== Published and editorial works ==
Together with George Shulman, Cole co-edited the 2019 book Michael Paul Rogin: Derangement and Liberalism. She was also a co-editor in 2019, with Estelle Ferrarese, of How Capitalism Forms Our Lives. Cole has served as an editor of numerous academic journals, including as an editor-in-chief of philoSOPHIA: A Journal of Transcontinental Feminism.

Cole has published on topics like victimhood and vulnerability in news publications like Salon and Fortune, and her work has been covered in outlets like the BBC and Truthout.

== Selected bibliography ==
- The cult of true victimhood: from the war on welfare to the war on terror (2007)
- "All of Us Are Vulnerable, But Some Are More Vulnerable than Others: The Political Ambiguity of Vulnerability Studies, an Ambivalent Critique", Critical Horizons (May 2016). This article is also Chapter 7 in * The Politics of Vulnerability. (1st ed., ebook). Routledge, 2017. ISBN 9781351719551. Estelle Ferrarese edited the work and wrote the introduction, "Vulnerability: A concept with which to undo the world as it is?", a text that was originally published in Critical Horizons, 17:2, May 2016, pp.149-159. Other contributors to the work: Robert Castel, Veena Das, Penelope Deutscher, Sandra Laugier, and Noémi Michel.
- How Capitalism Forms Our Lives, co-editor with Estelle Ferrarese (2019)
