= Emmanuel Cattin =

French philosopher (born 1966)

- Born: 1966 (age 59–60)

Education
- Education: École Normale Supérieure (BA, MA); Paris I Panthéon Sorbonne University I (PhD)

Philosophical work
- Era: 20th-/21st-century philosophy
- Region: Western philosophy
- School: Continental philosophy

== Biography ==
A graduate of the École Normale Supérieure (class of 1990), in 1996 he defended his PhD thesis on Schelling at Paris I Panthéon Sorbonne University I, under the direction of Bernard Bourgeois, a scholar of German Idealism and member of Académie des Sciences Morales et Politiques. Initially appointed as a lecturer at Blaise Pascal University, he went on to become a tenured professor there in 2004. In 2015, he joined the philosophy department at Université de Paris-Sorbonne (Paris IV) (which became Sorbonne Université in 2018), taking up the Chair of Metaphysics previously held by Jean-Luc Marion. He is director of the research unit, "Métaphysique, histoires, transformations, actualités".

His phenomenological approach involves understanding appearance as a manifestation of the spirit, in a constant dialogue with both Hegel and Heidegger. He is also specializes in Nietzsche's philosophy, as well as in philosophy of religion.

Since 2015, he has been the director of Paris publishing house Vrin's “Library of Philosophical Texts" and "Library of History of Philosophy" series.

== Publications ==
=== Author ===
- Transformations de la métaphysique. Commentaires sur la philosophie transcendantale de Schelling (in French). Paris: Vrin. 2001.
- Schelling (in French). Paris: Ellipses. 2003..
- La Décision de philosopher (in French). Hildesheim: Georg Olms. 2005..
- Vers la Simplicité. Phénoménologie hégélienne (in French). Paris: Vrin. 2010..
- Sérénité. Eckhart, Schelling, Heidegger (in French). Paris: Vrin. 2012..
- Majestas Dei. Seigneurie et liberté (in French). Paris: Vrin. 2018.
- La venue de la vérité. Phénoménologie de l'esprit selon Jean (in French). Paris: Vrin. 2021.

=== Translator ===
- Nietzsche (1992). Le Service divin des Grecs. Paris: L'Herne.
- Arrien (1992). Manuel d'Épictète. Paris: GF Flammarion.
- Leibniz (1998). "Éléments de la raison". Recherches générales sur l'analyse des notions et des vérités: 24 thèses métaphysiques et autres textes logiques et métaphysique. éd. Jean-Baptiste Rauzy. Paris: PUF.
- Schelling (2000). Exposition de mon système de la philosophie. Paris: Vrin.
