= Veena Das =

Indian anthropologist

Veena Das, FBA (born 1945 in India) is the Krieger-Eisenhower Professor of Anthropology at the Johns Hopkins University. Her areas of theoretical specialisation include the anthropology of violence, social suffering, and the state. Das has received multiple international awards including the Ander Retzius Gold Medal, delivered the prestigious Lewis Henry Morgan Lecture and was named a foreign honorary member of the American Academy of Arts and Sciences. In the Fall of 1999, she was a Fellow at the Swedish Collegium for Advanced Study in Uppsala, Sweden.

== Education ==
Das studied at the Indraprastha College for Women and the Delhi School of Economics at the University of Delhi and taught there from 1967 to 2000. She completed her PhD in 1970 under the supervision of M. N. Srinivas from the Delhi School of Economics. She was professor of anthropology at the New School for Social Research from 1997 to 2000, before moving to Johns Hopkins University, where she served as chair of the Department of Anthropology between 2001 and 2008.

== Books ==
Her first book Structure and Cognition: Aspects of Hindu Caste and Ritual (Oxford University Press, Delhi, 1977) brought the textual practices of 13th to 17th century in relation to self representation of caste groups in focus. Her identification of the structure of Hindu thought in terms of the tripartite division between priesthood, kinship and renunciation proved to be an extremely important structuralist interpretation of the important poles within which innovations and claims to new status by caste groups took place.

Veena Das's recent works are Slum Acts (John Wiley and Sons Ltd, 2020), Affliction: Health, Disease, Poverty (Fordham University Press, 2014) and Life and Words: Violence and the Descent into the Ordinary (California University Press, 2006). Das sees violence not as an interruption of ordinary life but as something that is implicated in the ordinary. The philosopher Stanley Cavell has written a memorable foreword to the book in which he says that one way of reading it is as a companion to Wittgenstein's Philosophical Investigations. One of the chapters in Life and Words deals with the state of abducted women in the post-independence time period and has been the interest of various legal historians.

Life and Words is heavily influenced by Wittgenstein and Stanley Cavell, but it also deals with particular moments in history such as the Partition of India and the assassination of Indira Gandhi in 1984.

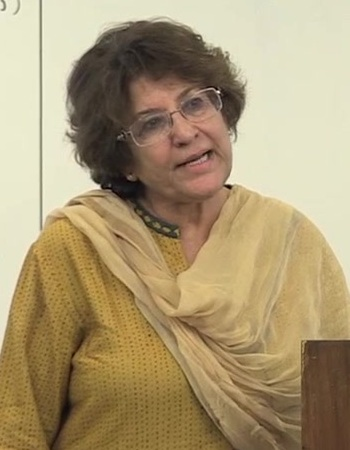
Image of Professor Veena Das

The book 'narrates the lives of particular persons and communities who were deeply embedded in these events, and it describes the way that the event attaches itself with its tentacles into everyday life and folds itself into the recesses of the ordinary.'

Her article, The Boundaries of the 'We': Cruelty, Responsibility, and Forms of Life, was first printed in Critical Horizons (May 2016) and then reprinted as Chapter 2 in The Politics of Vulnerability. (1st ed., ebook). Routledge, 2017. ISBN 9781351719551. Estelle Ferrarese edited the work and wrote the introduction. All chapters in this book were previously published in Critical Horizons, 17:2, May 2016. Other contributors to the work: Robert Castel, Sandra Laugier, Penelope Deutscher, Noémi Michel, and Alyson Cole.

== Research ==
Since the eighties she became engrossed in the study of violence and social suffering. Her edited book, Mirrors of Violence: Communities, Riots and Survivors in South Asia published by Oxford University Press in 1990 was one of the first to bring issues of violence within anthropology of South Asia. A trilogy on these subjects that she edited with Arthur Kleinman and others in the late nineties and early twenties gave a new direction to these fields. The volumes are titled Social Suffering; Violence and Subjectivity; and Remaking a World.

== Awards ==
She received the Anders Retzius Gold Medal from the Swedish Society for Anthropology and Geography in 1995, and an honorary doctorate from the University of Chicago in 2000. She is a foreign honorary member of the American Academy of Arts and Sciences and a fellow of the Third World Academy of Sciences. In 2007, Das delivered the Lewis Henry Morgan Lecture at the University of Rochester, considered by many to be the most important annual lecture series in the field of Anthropology. Prof. Das was elected as Fellow to the British Academy in 2019.

- Huxley Medal (2026)
