= PhiloSOPHIA =

Scholarly journal

philoSOPHIA
- Discipline: Feminist philosophy, continental philosophy
- Language: English
- Edited by: Alyson Cole, Kyoo Lee

Publication details
- History: 2011–present
- Publisher: SUNY Press
- Frequency: Biannual

Standard abbreviations
- ISO 4: Philosophia (Albany, N.Y.)

Indexing
- ISSN: 2155-0891 (print); 2155-0905 (web)
- LCCN: 2010204468
- OCLC no.: 889293608

Links
- Journal homepage; Online access at Project MUSE

philoSOPHIA: A Journal of Transcontinental Feminism is an international, interdisciplinary, biannual peer-reviewed academic journal covering feminist theory and continental philosophy. Published by SUNY Press, the journal was established by philoSOPHIA: the Society for Continental Feminism, which was founded in 2008. The editors-in-chief are Alyson Cole and Kyoo Lee.

Established in 2008 as philoSOPHIA: A Journal of Continental Feminism, it was "transcontinentalized" in 2018 to broaden its scope and inclusivity. The new subtitle indicates the journal's focus on feminist thought that transcends cultural and philosophical boundaries, emphasizing a commitment to global feminist dialogue rather than a single regional or cultural perspective.

== History ==
The journal is the product of philoSOPHIA: the Society for Continental Feminism, which was founded in Tennessee in 2008—initially as the French Feminism Circle—by Kelly Oliver (Vanderbilt University) and Stacy Keltner (Kennesaw State University). The journal was established in 2011, after the society's third annual conference. The founding co-editors were Elaine Miller and Emily Zakin (Miami University).

According to its founding editors, the society and journal were named after Sophia, the feminine aspect of God who fell from grace because of her love of knowledge. The name serves to illustrate that women who love philosophy are not necessarily in love with the patriarchy.

Since issue 9.1 (2019), the journal's cover image has been replaced, substituting the previous one with a photo collage by the artist Lorna Simpson, called Unanswerable.

== Abstracting and indexing ==
The journal is abstracted and indexed in:

- EBSCO databases
- Emerging Sources Citation Index
- Modern Language Association Database
- PhilPapers
- ProQuest databases
- The Philosopher's Index

== See also ==
- List of philosophy journals
- List of women's studies journals
