= Catherine Perret =

French philosopher

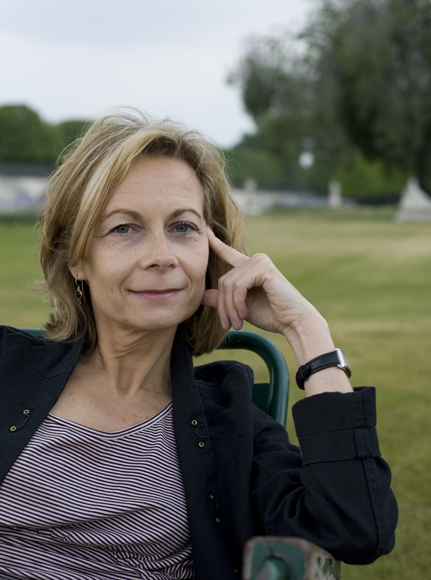
Catherine Perret

Catherine Perret (born 9 July 1956 in Paris) is associate professor of modern and contemporary aesthetics and theory at Nanterre University (Paris X). She obtained her Ph.D. in philosophy and is known for her work on Walter Benjamin, most notably by her book Walter Benjamin ou la critique en effet. Dr. Perret was the director of the Art of Exhibition Department at Paris X. She served as a program director at the Collège International de Philosophie from 1995 to 2001. She is a recipient of the prestigious title Chevalier des Palmes académiques. She collaborated with Bernard Stiegler in Ars Industrialis. Dr. Perret is currently responsible for the Centre de recherche sur l'art, philosophie, esthétique (CRéART - PHI) at Paris X.

== Reference books and texts ==
1. Walter Benjamin sans destin, Ed. La Différence, Paris, 1992, rééd. revue et augmentée d'une préface, Bruxelles, éd. La Lettre volée, 2007.
2. Marcel Duchamp, le manieur de gravité, Ed. CNDP, Paris, 1998
3. Rapport "(non publié) pour le Ministère de la Culture et de la Communication : L'art contemporain et la question de son exposition (2001).
4. Les porteurs d'ombre, mimésis et modernité, coll. L'extrême contemporain, Ed. Belin, Paris, 2002.
5. Olivier Mosset, la peinture, même, éditions Ides et Calendes, Lausanne, mars 2004.
6. Non Compatibles, Une peinture sans qualités, une exposition de Catherine Perret, éditions Les Presses du réel, Dijon, 2006

== Art exhibitions curated ==
1. Unlimited Space 1, Paris, Galerie Les Filles du Calvaire, Avril-Juin, 2000
2. Unlimited Space 2, Bruxelles, Galerie Les Filles du Calvaire, Janvier-Mars, 2001
3. Tableaux-Ecrans, Paris, Bruxelles, Galerie les Filles du Calvaire, Février-Avril, 2004
4. Non Compatibles, une peinture sans qualités, Toulon, Villa Tamaris, Novembre-Janvier, 2005
5. Fetish and Konsum, Stuttgart, Akademie Solitude, Mai-Juin, 2008
