= Kelly Oliver =

American philosopher (born 1958)

- Born: July 28, 1958 (age 68)
- Occupations: W. Alton Jones Professor of Philosophy, Vanderbilt University

Academic background
- Education: Gonzaga University (BA); Northwestern University (PhD)
- Thesis: Woman's Language Man's Voice: A Reading of Gender and Language in Nietzsche (1987)

Kelly Ann Oliver (born July 28, 1958) is an American philosopher specializing in feminism, political philosophy and ethics. She is W. Alton Jones Professor of Philosophy at Vanderbilt University in Nashville, Tennessee. She is also a founder of the feminist philosophy journal philoSOPHIA.

Oliver is the author of 16 scholarly books, 12 edited volumes, and scores of scholarly articles. Her books include Response Ethics (2019), Carceral Humanitarianism: The Logic of Refugee Detention (2017), Hunting Girls: Sexual Violence from The Hunger Games to Campus Rape (2016), and Earth and World: Philosophy After the Apollo Missions (2015) and her most recognized work, Witnessing: Beyond Recognition (2001). She is also a novelist and the author of three mystery series: The Jessica James Mysteries, The Pet Detective Mysteries, and The Fiona Figg Mysteries.

== Education and career ==
Oliver was raised in Montana, Idaho, and Spokane, Washington, the oldest of four children (three girls and a boy). Her father was a lumberjack and engineer. On both sides of the family, her ancestors were among the first to settle in Northern Idaho. She received her BA in philosophy and communications from Gonzaga University in 1979 and her PhD in philosophy from Northwestern University in 1987. Before moving to Vanderbilt in 2005, she taught in the philosophy departments of West Virginia University, the University of Texas at Austin and SUNY Stony Brook.

== Selected works ==
=== Earth and World (2015) ===
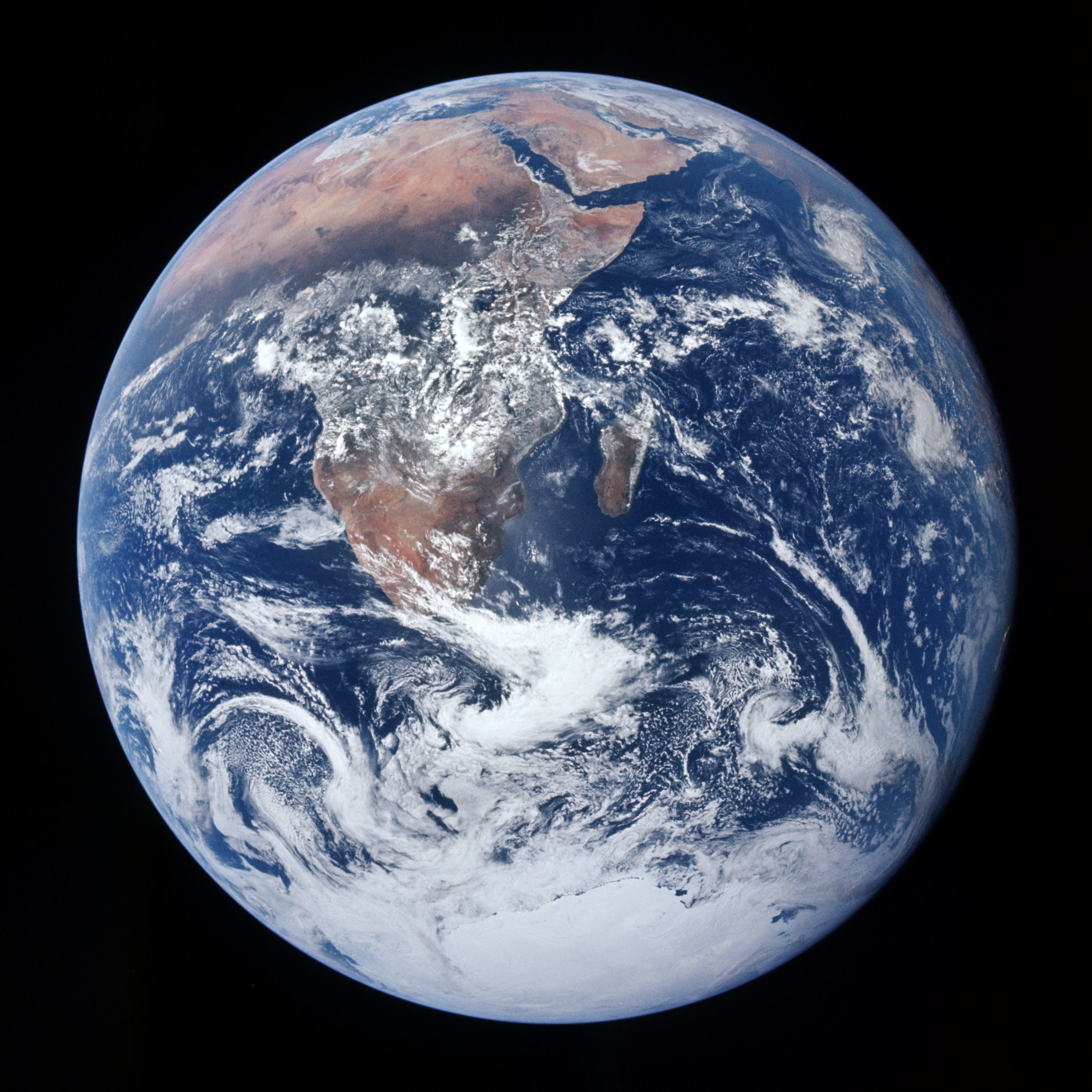
The Blue Marble, 7 December 1972

In Earth and World: Philosophy After the Apollo Missions (Columbia University Press, 2015), Oliver explores the reactions to the first pictures of Earth, including Earthrise and The Blue Marble, taken during the Apollo missions of the late 1960s and early 1970s. Examining the rhetoric surrounding these photographs, she identifies a tension between nationalism and cosmopolitanism that sets the tone for this book. Starting with Immanuel Kant, Oliver follows a path of thinking our relations to each other through our relation to the Earth, from Kant's politics based on the fact that we share the limited surface of the Earth, through Hannah Arendt's and Martin Heidegger's warnings that by leaving the surface of the Earth, we endanger not only politics but also our very being as human beings, to Jacques Derrida's last meditations on the singular world of each human being. The guiding question that motivates Oliver's book is: How can we share the Earth with those with whom we do not even share a world?

=== Technologies of Life and Death (2013) ===
In Technologies of Life and Death: From Cloning to Capital Punishment (Fordham 2013), Oliver analyzes the extremes of birth and death insofar as they are mediated by technologies of life and death. First, with an eye to reproductive technologies, Oliver considers how the terms of debates over genetic engineering and cloning change if we challenge the assumption of liberal individualism at their heart. In this book, she shows how the very terms of contemporary debates over technologies of life and death, from cloning to capital punishment change if we unseat the notion of an autonomous liberal individual. She argues that the central aim of this book is to approach contemporary problems raised by technologies of life and death as ethical issues that call for a more nuanced approach than mainstream philosophy can provide. She maintains that the ethical stakes in these debates are never far from political concerns such as enfranchisement, citizenship, oppression, racism, sexism, and the public policies that normalize them. Oliver disarticulates a tension between ethics and politics that runs through these issues in order to suggest a more ethical politics by turning the force of sovereign violence back against itself. In the end, Oliver proposes a corrective for moral codes and political clichés that turn us into mere answering machines, namely, following Derrida, what she comes to call Response Ethics.

=== Knock me up, Knock me down (2010) ===
In Knock me up, Knock me down: Images of Pregnancy in Hollywood Film (Columbia University Press, 2010), Oliver analyses recent films produced in the US dealing with pregnancy, including Junebug and Quinceañera. She examines the tensions between progressive and conservative elements in these films. Specifically, Oliver examines the ways in which these films redeploy the rhetoric of choice in the service of family values. In addition, she discusses apparent anxieties about new reproductive technologies that uncouple sex and reproduction. She argues that what she calls "momcom" is a new subgenre of romcom. And she examines images of pregnancy in horror and science fiction films, particularly in terms of fears of miscegenation. Overall, Oliver argues that the pregnant belly has become a screen for fears and desires associated with sex, race, gender and sexuality.

=== Animal Lessons (2009) ===
In Animal Lessons: How They Teach Us to Be Human (Columbia University Press, 2009), Oliver argues that in the work of thinkers as diverse as Heidegger, Merleau-Ponty, Derrida, Agamben, Freud, Lacan and Kristeva, animals play a key theoretical role in defining what it means to be human. While philosophers have historically been interested in maintaining a strong distinction between the animal and the human (often on the basis of reason), Oliver's analysis suggests that much philosophical discourse about humanity and ethics depends on lessons learned from animal behavior. While she questions the viability of a strict animal/human dichotomy, Animal Lessons does not follow the typical trajectory of ethical work on animal rights. In fact, Oliver is critical of rights-based ethical discourse-Discourse ethics that would simply expand its scope to include animals, since such a strategy would leave unquestioned assumptions about the nature of humanity on which rights depend. Oliver writes: "The man-animal binary is not just any opposition; it is the one used most often to justify violence, not only man's violence to animals, but also man's violence to other people deemed like animals. Until we interrogate the history of this opposition with its exclusionary values, considering animals (or particular animals) like us or recognizing that we are also a species of animal does very little to change "how we eat the other", as Jacques Derrida might say."

=== Women as Weapons of War (2007) ===
In Women as Weapons of War: Iraq, Sex, and the Media (Columbia University 2007), Oliver analyzes media images of women involved in violence in the Middle East and the Iraq War. From the women involved in Abu Ghraib and Guantánamo Bay prisons, to rescued Pfc. Jessica Lynch, to Palestinian women suicide bombers, recent media coverage has turned them into "weapons" of war; their very bodies are imagined as dangerous. Oliver links these images of what some reporters have called "equal opportunity killers more dangerous than the males" with older images of dangerous women from Hollywood films, literature, and religious traditions. She argues that these latest examples of women figured as weapons are in an important sense a continuation of stereotypes of dangerous women who use their sexuality as a deadly weapon to deceive and trap men.

=== The Colonization of Psychic Space (2004) ===
In The Colonization of Psychic Space: A Psychoanalytic Social Theory of Oppression (University of Minnesota, 2004), engaging with work by Fanon, Kristeva and others, Oliver develops a psychoanalytic social theory of oppression, particularly racist and sexist oppression. Oliver argues that depression, shame, anger and alienation can be the result of social institutions rather than individual pathology. She explores the complex ways in which the alienation unique to oppression leads to depression, shame, anger or violence, which are misread and misdiagnosed as individual or group pathologies, then used to justify more violent forms of oppression. She concludes that depression, shame, anger and alienation can be transformed into agency, individuality, solidarity, and community through sublimation and forgiveness. In the course of her analysis, Oliver develops a theory of social melancholy as a counterbalance to medical and psychological discourses of women's depression.

=== Witnessing (2001) ===
In her most influential work, Witnessing: Beyond Recognition (University of Minnesota, 2001), Oliver develops a critique of recognition models of identity and proposes witnessing as an alternative. She argues that recognition models of identity and subjectivity promote false oppositions and hostilities, including the split between subjectivity and agency evoked in antifoundationalist theories. Oliver critically engages various theories of recognition (and misrecognition) from Charles Taylor's version of multiculturalism and Axel Honneth's analysis of struggles for recognition, to Jacques Lacan's notion of misrecognition and Judith Butler's theory of the performative. She argues that the demand for recognition is a symptom of the pathology of oppression that perpetuates subject-object/other and same-different hierarchies. While theories of misrecognition challenge us to be vigilant in exposing the illusion of familiarity or sameness, most of them still propose an antagonistic subject-object/other relationship. Even contemporary theories of recognition concerned with difference and the other do not move us beyond subject-centered notions of relationships. Oliver argues that rather than talk about the other—a discursive move that perpetuates the subject-other hierarchy—we should diagnose othered subjectivity. Oliver develops a theory of subjectivity taking othered subjectivity as a starting point. This book is the beginning of the Response Ethics approach that is further developed in all Oliver's subsequent work.

=== Subjectivity without Subjects (1998) ===
In Subjectivity Without Subjects: From Abject Fathers to Desiring Mothers (Rowman & Littlefield 1998), Oliver explores the relationship between images of maternity, paternity, rhetoric, subjectivity and ethics. One of her central questions is: if there is no unified subject, then who is the agent of political action or change? This question has forced theorists to choose sides, for or against identity politics. Rather than choose sides, Oliver argues that we need to explore the dynamics of identity. By thinking of subjectivity as fluid, she navigates between two extremes that plague contemporary attempts to theorize difference: at the one pole, the position that I can understand anyone by just taking up her perspective, which makes communication unencumbered; and at the other, the position that I can understand no one because of radical alterity that prevents me from taking up her perspective, which makes communication impossible. Oliver argues that the first assumes that we are absolutely identical, which erases our differences, and the second assumes that we are absolutely different, which erases our communion. Both presume a certain solidity of the subject; both work with an oppositional notion of identity and difference; and both seem to presume that communication requires recognition. Oliver begins to explore the usefulness and limitations of the notion of recognition, and its flip side, abjection, in developing a theory of identity that opens the subject to otherness. She does so in the context of analyzing popular culture (specifically religious forms of masculinity evident in the Promise Keepers Movement and the Million Man March), an analysis of adoption laws, and a critical engagement with films by Fassbinder, Polanski, Bergman and Varda.

=== Family Values (1997) ===
In Family Values: Subjects Between Nature and Culture (Routledge 1997), Oliver continues where she left off in Womanizing Nietzsche. In this book she explores the ways that primary family relations affect subjectivity in my continued attempt to articulate a theory of subjectivity and intersubjectivity that can ground the ethical relation. Here, Oliver argues that there are contradictions at the heart of Western conceptions of maternity and paternity and the rhetoric surrounding those concepts that make our notions of relationships with ourselves and with others problematic. Using examples from philosophical texts, psychoanalytic theory, studies in biology and medicine, examples from legal cases, and popular culture, Oliver challenges notions of maternity that are associated with nature and notions of paternity that are associated with culture. By addressing familial relations as formative relationships in the development of our conceptions of ourselves as individuals in relationships, she develops novel notions of subjectivity and intersubjectivity that refigure our notions of ourselves and our notions of our relations to others. By articulating alternative ways to conceive of ourselves as subjects, Oliver develops an alternative intersubjective approach to ethics or questions of values, family values.

=== Womanizing Nietzsche (1995) ===
In Womanizing Nietzsche: Philosophy's Relation to the "Feminine" (Routledge 1995), Oliver continues to develop the themes of language, subjectivity, sexual difference, and ethics through an engagement with texts by Nietzsche, Derrida, Irigaray, and others. She argues that while Nietzsche and Derrida attempt to open up the notion of subjectivity so that is not autonomous and self-enclosed, they do so by excluding or appropriating femininity. In other words, while they open subjectivity onto otherness, they do so by foreclosing or appropriating specifically feminine otherness. Oliver maintains that the model of intersubjective relations operating in extreme versions of these texts is an Hegelian model stuck at the level of the master-slave fight to the death where the only options are murder or suicide. In the last chapter, "Save the Mother", turning to new developments in biology, Oliver suggests a new model for conceiving of intersubjective relationships that moves us beyond the violent master-slave dialectic.

=== Reading Kristeva (1993) ===
In Reading Kristeva: Unraveling the Double-bind (Indiana University 1993), Oliver takes up the question of the relation between language, ethics, subjectivity and sexual difference in the context of Kristeva's large body of work. She indicates how Kristeva's notion of a subject-in-process can be useful in formulating a notion of subjectivity that allows for an explanation of women's oppression and some possibilities of overcoming that oppression. In addition, she goes beyond Kristeva's few gestures towards ethics, to suggest how the notion of a subject-in-process might ground a reformulated ethical subject. Engaging with Kristeva's distinction between the semiotic and symbolic dimensions of language, Oliver explores the liberatory potential for the revolution in poetic language for political revolution.
