= Sidi Mohamed Barkat =

Algerian philosopher employed in Paris

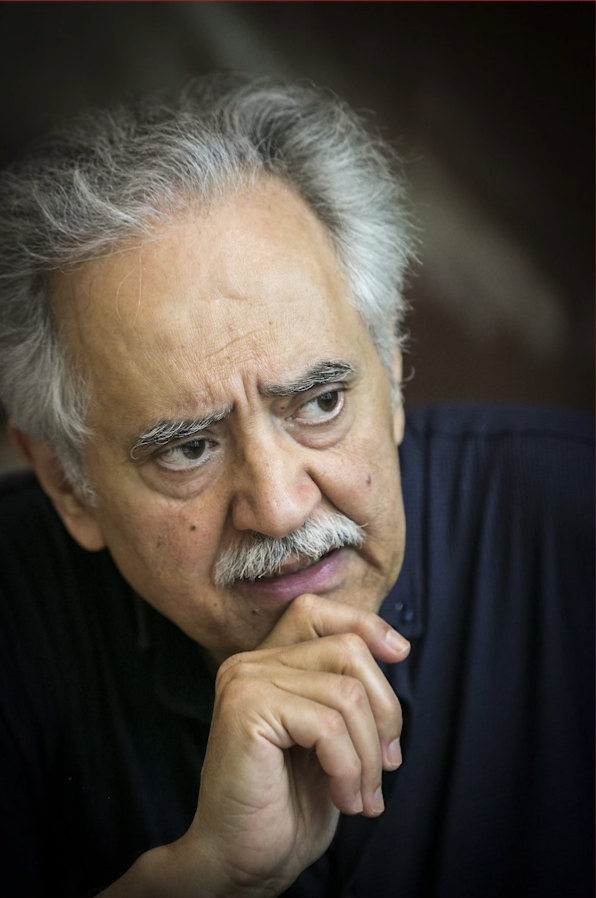
- Born: 1948 (age 77–78)

Sidi Mohamed Barkat (born 1948) is an Algerian philosopher employed in Paris.

He was an associate researcher at the psychology of work and action laboratory at the Conservatoire national des arts et métiers. After several years of employment by the university, where he was mainly occupied with questions of epistemology in the social sciences, Sidi Mohammed Barkat directed a research programme at the Collège international de philosophie in Paris on the image and condition of "the native Algerian" from 1998 to 2004.

He proposed a conception of legal, political and social character based on the terminology of the corps d'exception (body of exclusion). This made direct reference to the experience of the Algerian population's experience during the French occupation and intersects with the highly politicised debate about French treatment of indigenous peoples (see Indigénat). Pierre Tevanian has used this concept in his own work. Other scholars who have also mentioned or attempted to apply the concept in their own work include Gérard Bras, Daniel Borrillo, Patricia Mothes, Malika Mansouri, Olivier Le Cour Grandmaison, Claire Hancock, and Vincent Houillon.

== Publications ==
- Des Français contre la terreur d'État. Algérie 1954-1962 (On French against State terror), Éditions Reflex, Paris, 2002.
- Le Corps d'exception : les artifices du pouvoir colonial et la destruction de la vie (The Body of Exclusion: The methods of colonial power and its destruction of life), Éditions Amsterdam, 2005
