= Robert Harvey (literary theorist) =

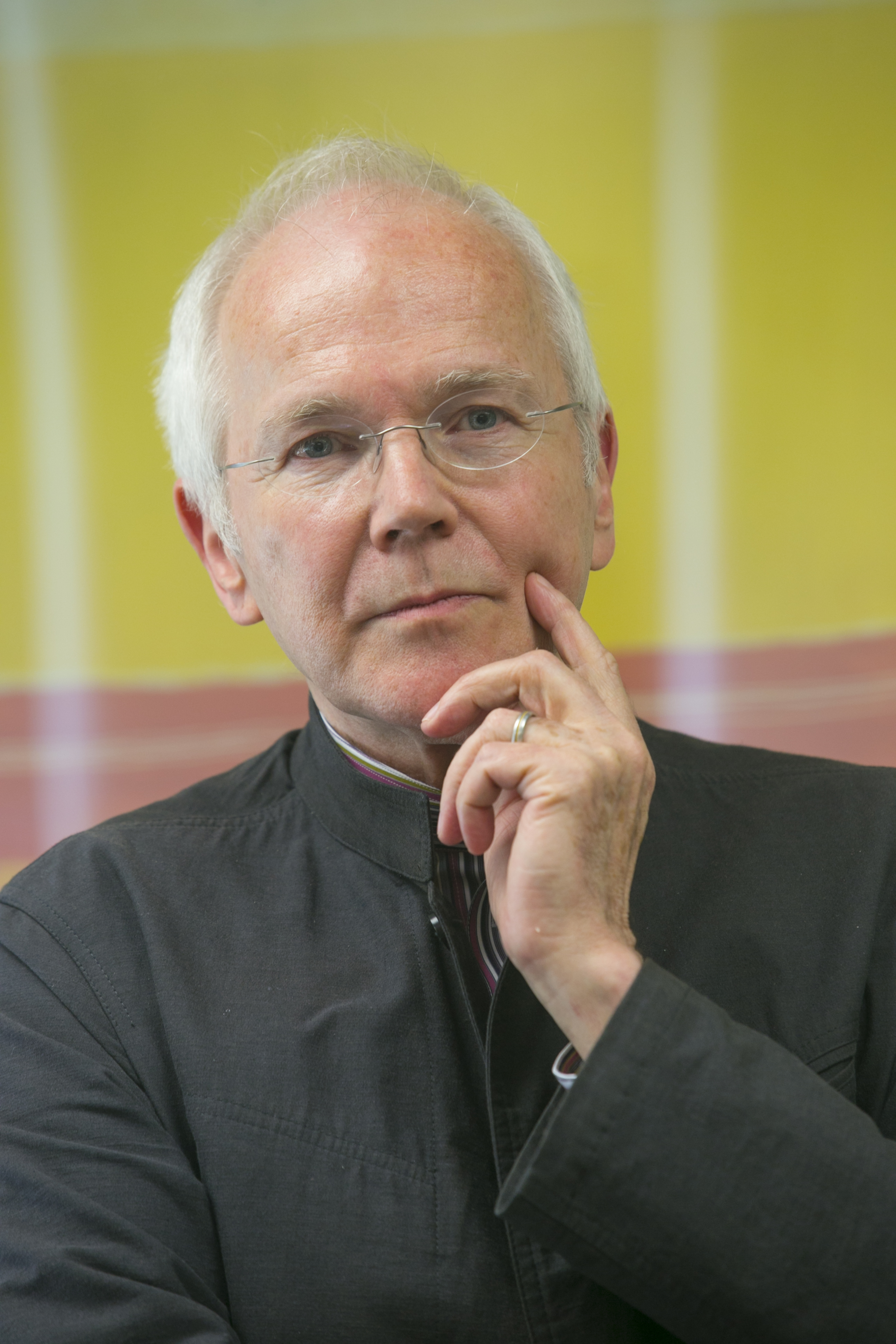
Robert Harvey

Robert Harvey (born Robert James Harvey; 1951 in Oakland, California) is a literary scholar, philosopher, and academic. He is Distinguished Professor Emeritus at the State University of New York at Stony Brook. He lectures in aesthetics, comparative literature, philosophy, and theory. His research and publications are primarily concerned with the interpenetrations of literary and philosophical discourses.

He has written on Samuel Beckett, Primo Levi, Michel Foucault, Jean-François Lyotard, Jean-Paul Sartre, Marguerite Duras, Marcel Duchamp and Michel Deguy and has translated Lyotard, Deguy, Foucault, Jacques Derrida, Paul Ricœur, and other French thinkers. His most recent books are The Rhetoric of Manipulation: Unmasking Semantic Perversions (Bloomsbury, 2025), Parmi les gisants: penser le cimetière (Presses Universitaires de France, 2024) and Sharing Common Ground: A Space for Ethics. Forthcoming in 2027 is Mormozionism: A Geneaology of Colonial Imaginary. Harvey is one of several scholars who prepared the Pléiade edition of the complete works of Marguerite Duras.

Harvey served as chair of Cultural Studies and Comparative Literature at Stony Brook until 2017, when these disciplines were "strategically" eliminated. Prior to that, he had chaired the Department of Cultural Analysis and Theory from 2002 until 2015, and was a Program Director at the Collège International de Philosophie in Paris, from 2001 until 2007. From 2017 until his retirement from Stony Brook, his academic home was the Department of Philosophy.

Harvey completed his B.A in French Literature at the University of California, Berkeley in 1972, and an M.A. at San Francisco State University in 1975. He returned to academia in 1980 and completed his doctoral dissertation at the University of California, Berkeley in 1988 on the ethical thought of Jean-Paul Sartre. During that period he also studied at the École Normale Supérieure and the Université de Paris VII (Jussieu). Harvey obtained an Habilitation à diriger des recherches (H.D.R.) degree in 2001 by defending a second thesis entitled "Les Styles de l'éthique".

Harvey's latest manuscript is entitled Sion en Amérique. Généalogie d'un imaginaire colonial.

== Books ==
- [2027] Mormon Zionism: Geneaology of a Colonial Imaginary. New York, London, Berlin: Springer Nature.
- (2025) The Rhetoric of Manipulation: Unmasking Semantic Perversions. New York & London: Bloomsbury.
- (2024) Parmi les gisants: penser le cimetière. Paris: Presses Universitaires de France (Perspectives critiques).
- (2017) Sharing Common Ground: A Space for Ethics. New York & London: Bloomsbury.
- (2010) Witnessness: Beckett, Levi, Dante and the Foundations of Ethics. New York & London: Continuum; translated as Témoignabilité by Thierry Gillyboeuf. Geneva: MetisPresses, 2015.
- (2009) Les Écrits de Marguerite Duras. Bibliographie des œuvres et de la critique, 1940-2006 (with Bernard Alazet and Hélène Volat). Paris: Éditions de l'Imec.
- (2006) De l'exception à la règle. USA PATRIOT Act (with Hélène Volat). Paris: Lignes & Manifestes.
- (2003) Témoins d'artifice. Paris: L'Harmattan.
- (2002) Les Écrits de Michel Deguy: Bibliographie des œuvres et de la critique, 1960-2000. Paris: Éditions de l'Imec.
- (1997) Marguerite Duras: A Bio-Bibliography (with Hélène Volat). Westport, CT: Greenwood Press.
- (1991) Search for a Father: Sartre, Paternity and the Question of Ethics. Ann Arbor: University of Michigan Press.

== Edited volumes ==
- (2014) Marguerite Duras, Œuvres complètes (dir. Gilles Philippe). Paris: Gallimard (Bibliothèque de la Pléiade), v. 3.
- (2011) Marguerite Duras, Œuvres complètes (dir. Gilles Philippe). Paris: Gallimard (Bibliothèque de la Pléiade), vv. 1-2.
- (2009) Filiation and Its Discontents (with E. Ann Kaplan and François Noudelmann). Stony Brook: The Humanities Institute (Occasional Papers, 5).
- (2004) Politique et filiation (with E. Ann Kaplan and François Noudelmann). Paris: Kimé.
- (2003) Queer: Repenser les identités / Rue Descartes 40 (with Pascal Le Brun-Cordier). Paris: Presses Universitaires de France.
- (2002) Marguerite Duras: la tentation du poétique (with Bernard Alazet and Christiane Blot-Labarrère). Paris: Presses de la Sorbonne-Nouvelle.
- (2001) Jean-François Lyotard: Time and Judgment / Yale French Studies 99 (with Lawrence R. Schehr). New Haven, CT: Yale University Press.
- (2001) Joyous Wakes, Dignified Deaths: Reflections on Death and Dignity. Stony Brook: The Humanities Institute (Occasional Papers, 2).
- (2000) Afterwords: Essays in Memory of Jean-François Lyotard. Stony Brook: The Humanities Institute (Occasional Papers, 1).

== Translated books ==
- (2023) Jean-François Lyotard, Readings in Infancy (with Kiff Bamford). New York & London: Bloomsbury.
- (2018) Michel Deguy. To That Which Ends Not. Threnody. Brooklyn: Spuyten Duyvil.
- (2001) Jean-François Lyotard. Soundproof Room: Malraux's Anti-Aesthetics. Stanford: Stanford University Press.
- (1999) Jean-François Lyotard. Signed, Malraux. Minneapolis: University of Minnesota Press.
- (1989) Michel Meyer, ed. From Metaphysics to Rhetoric. Dordrecht: Kluwer.
