= Jean-Marie Vincent (philosopher) =

French philosopher, political scientist, Marxist theorist

- Born: 6 March 1934; Nancy, France
- Died: 6 April 2004; Paris, France
- Other name: Vincent Valette
- Political party: PCI

Education
- Education: Sciences Po; Paris 8 University
- Thesis: Problèmes méthodologiques des sciences sociales contemporaines : Max Weber, l’École de Francfort, le marxisme italien (1972)
- Doctoral advisor: François Chatelet; Alfred Grosser

Philosophical work
- Era: Contemporary philosophy
- Region: Western philosophy
- School: Continental philosophy, Marxism, critical theory
- Institutions: University of Picardy Jules Verne
- Doctoral students: Gilbert Achcar; Estelle Ferrarese; Daniel Lindenberg; Henri Maler
- Main interests: Political philosophy
- Notable works: Critique du travail (1987)
- Notable ideas: Critique of work

Jean-Marie Vincent (6 March 1934 – 6 April 2004) was a French political philosopher, political scientist, and Marxist theorist.

== Early life and education ==
Vincent grew up in the Grand Est region of northeastern France, the son of Gaston Vincent, an industrial worker, Marguerite, née Dossmann, a homemaker. He pursued secondary studies and the baccalauréat in Paris between 1952–53. It was at this time that he joined the Internationalist Communist Party (PCI).

Vincent completed his undergraduate degree at the University of Paris, then he obtained a doctorate from the Paris Institute of Political Studies (Sciences Po) in 1961, under the supervision of Alfred Grosser, and a doctorat d'État in 1972 under the direction of François Chatelet.

Around the time of the reorganization of the Paris University system after the May 68 protests, Vincent was deeply involved at what had newly become Paris 8 University, a key figure in the establishment their political science department, and he remained there until he retired in 2002. For several years he served as Vice-President of the Council for Academic and Student Affairs at that university.

== Career ==
Vincent based his work on the critical theory of the Frankfurt School, and its relationship to Marxism to Francophone readers. (Note: From Hemmens (2019): "He was, moreover, one of the first to introduce the French speaking public to the foundations of these debates in The Critical Theory of the Frankfurt School." Hemmens cites Vincent's own work here: Galilée, 1976.) Vincent developed his own conceptual framework, notably in Critique du travail (1987).

His initial Marxism was influenced by the epistemology of Galvano Della Volpe et Lucio Colletti and the theory of commodity fetishism. By the 1980s, his focus had evolved into ecology and his unique interpretation of Marx through the lenses of Georg Lukacs, Ernst Bloch and Martin Heidegger.

Vincent was a member of the Unified Socialist Party (France) and involved in the Tribune Socialiste with André Gorz. Gorz spoke about his longtime working relationship with Vincent after the latter's death in 2004, recalling specifically the early 1960s when Vincent strongly influenced him and was, indeed, a "driving force" in the PSU and the Tribune Socialiste where Gorz also worked. Gorz credits Vincent as one of the first in France to change the academic conversations on socialism (a time when Western Marxism tended to focus on the 1844 Manuscripts) by turning their attention to the Grundrisse, a text Gorz says remained fundamental to Vincent's thinking.

At the same time, Vincent also became a specialist on German sociology, especially Max Weber, and also on Italian theoretical Marxism, i.e. Lucio Colletti and Galvano Della Volpe. The latter led him to fetishism as a lens through which to interpret Das Kapital, which Gorz says kept him from the "pitfalls of Althussérien theory."

=== Editorial work ===
After years coediting Futur antérieur, a journal founded by Vincent with Denis Berger and Toni Negri and that folded in 1998, (Note: The archive for Futur antérieur is available digitally through the ongoing Multitudes (revue) journal.) Vincent founded Variations (revue): Revue internationale de théorie critique in 2001. Vincent was also founder and editor of the revue Critiques de l’économie politique with Pierre Salama and Jacques Valier.

== Reception ==
In The Critique of Work in Modern French Thought (2019), (Note: Part of a series jointly organized by the Department of Latin American and Iberian Culture at Columbia University and the Department of English and Comparative Literature at UC Davis.) Alastair Hemmens identifies Vincent as an important figure in the development of a categorical critique of labour in France, thus part of a genealogy he goes through in the work including Charles Fourier, Guy Debord, Paul Lafargue, and André Breton. Primarily in the chapter, "The New Spirit of Capitalism and the Critique of Work Since May '68," Hemmens situates Vincent’s work within a strand of Marxist thought that challenged the treatment of labour as a transhistorical or inherently emancipatory category, and links his influence particularly to André Gorz. According to Hemmens, Gorz’s friendship and scholarship with Vincent contributed significantly to his engagement with the critique of labor movement. Hemmens also notes Vincent’s institutional role as founder of the political science department at Paris VIII, thus placing his theoretical work within the broader intellectual history of post-1968 French critical thought.

Political scientist Antoine Artous dedicated his book, Le fétichisme chez Marx, le marxisme comme théorie critique (2006), to Vincent. Artous cites and defends Vincent's "théorie de la forme valeur des produits du travail" in relation to the Marxist theory of value.

== Selected works ==
=== Books ===
- Fétichisme et société, Paris, Anthropos, 1973. Republished posthumously: Paris, Éditions Critiques, 2020.
- La théorie critique de l'École de Francfort, Paris, Éditions Galilée, 1976
- Les mensonges de l'État, Paris, Le Sycomore, 1979
- Critique du travail. Le faire et l'agir, Paris, PUF, 1987 ; rééd. Paris, Éditions Critiques, 2019.
- Abstract labour: a critique. Palgrave Macmillan, 1991. (doi:10.1007/978-1-349-21744-1).
- Marx après les marxismes, L'Harmattan, 1997, 2 volumes. The text " Marx l'obstiné " by Jean-Marie Vincent is founded in Volume 1.
- Max Weber ou la démocratie inachevée, Paris, Le Félin, 1998 (réédition en 2009)
- Un autre Marx, Lausanne, Page deux, 2001

=== Articles ===
- "La légende du travail." La liberté du travail, Éditions Syllepse, Paris (1995): 71-82.
- “Le Désenchantement Du Monde: Max Weber et Walter Benjamin.” Revue Européenne Des Sciences Sociales 33, no. 101 (1995): 95–106.
- “Max Weber et La Constellation Du Matérialisme Historique.” Actuel Marx, no. 11 (1992): 67–81.
- "La domination du travail abstrait." Critique de l’économie politique 1 (1977): 19-49.
- "The PCF and its history." New Left Review 1, no. 52 (1969): 39-46.
- "Le capitalisme selon Weber." L'Homme et la Société 4, no. 1 (1967): 61-77.

=== Co-authored works ===
- Vincent, Jean-Marie, Joachim Hirsch, and Margaret Wirth. L'État contemporain et le marxisme. F. Maspero, 1975.
- Cohen, Jim, and Jean-Marie Vincent. Abstract Labour: a Critique. Springer Publishing, 1991.
- Vers un nouvel anticapitalisme, (with Michel Vakaloulis et Pierre Zarka), Paris, Le Félin, 2003
- Sciences sociales et engagement, with Alexander Neumann (dir.), Paris, Éditions Syllepse, 2003.
- La Postérité de l'École de Francfort, with Alain Blanc (dir.), Paris, Syllepse, coll. "Variations", 2004. ISBN 2847970762

== Works cited ==
- Marx après les marxismes, L'Harmattan, 1997, 2 volumes. The text " Marx l'obstiné " by Jean-Marie Vincent is founded in Volume 1.
- Max Weber ou la démocratie inachevée, Paris, Le Félin, 1998 (réédition en 2009)
- Gianinazzi, Willy. « Vivre une vie qui ne se vit pas. Quand Jean-Marie Vincent et André Gorz débattaient de valeur et subjectivité (2000-2002) », Variations [En ligne], 17 | 2012, mis en ligne le 15 octobre 2012, consulté le 10 août 2026. URL : http://journals.openedition.org/variations/354 ; DOI : https://doi.org/10.4000/variations.354
- Hemmens, Alastair. The Critique of Work in Modern French Thought. From Charles Fourier to Guy Debord. Chapter Six: "The New Spirit of Capitalism and the Critique of Work in France Since May ’68." P.167-192, Springer Publishing, 2019. URL.
