= Tristan Garcia =

French writer (born 1981)

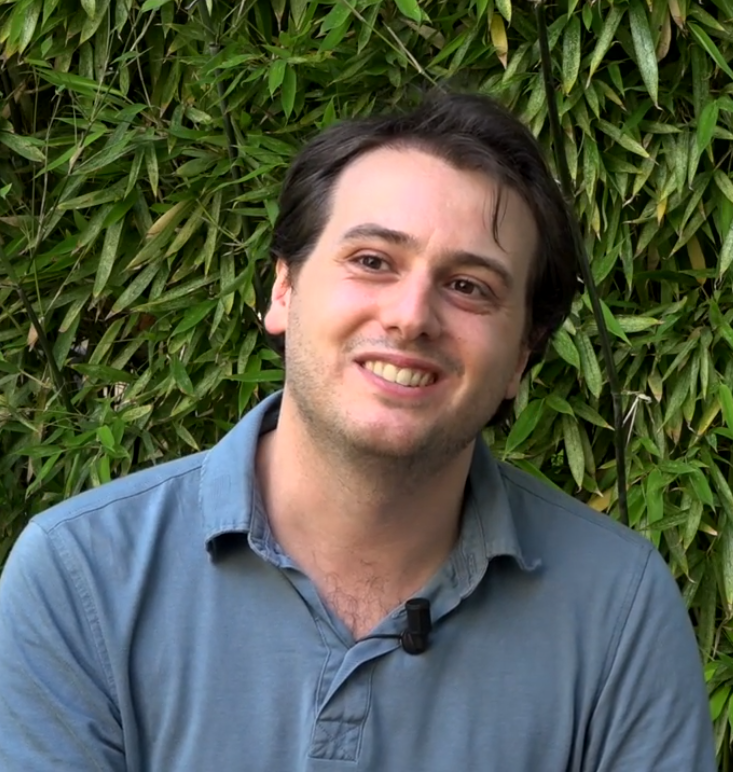
- Born: 5 April 1981 (age 45); Toulouse, France

Education
- Education: École Normale Supérieure; Paris-Sorbonne University
- Doctoral advisor: Sandra Laugier

Philosophical work
- Era: 21st-century philosophy
- Region: Western philosophy
- School: Continental philosophy Speculative realism
- Institutions: Jean Moulin University Lyon 3
- Main interests: Metaphysics
- Notable ideas: Ontology of a flat world

Tristan Garcia (born 5 April 1981) is a French philosopher and novelist. His first novel, La meilleure part des hommes (2008), won France's Prix de Flore. It was translated into English in 2010 with the title Hate: A Romance. His most important philosophical work, Form and Object, was translated into English in 2014.

== Life ==
Garcia was born in Toulouse, to academic parents. His most formative years were spent in Algeria. He studied philosophy at the École Normale Supérieure and Paris-Sorbonne University, and wrote his dissertation under Sandra Laugier. He currently teaches at Jean Moulin University Lyon 3.

== Works of fiction ==
=== Hate: A Romance ===
Garcia's first novel, La meilleure part des hommes (2008), won France's Prix de Flore. It was translated into English in 2010 with the title Hate: A Romance. The novel follows four lives from the rise of the Marais gay scene through Sarkozy's presidency, and it depicts the impact of HIV/AIDS in Paris. Garcia has said that he deliberately wrote a novel about events he did not experience in an effort to move away from the trend of autofiction in France.

Reviewing the English translation, Joanna Biggs praised the novel, calling it "compelling", and concluding that "the reader becomes as addicted to the unfolding drama as the narrator is". Alexander Nazaryan wrote that the book is "surprisingly taut and readable". He continued to praise the book for being "the kind of social novel his American counterparts too often avoid in favor of solipsistic musings". Nazaryan also criticized the work, writing that "Garcia is fluent in the currents of thought that have animated recent French history, and he has the dexterity to be flippant and morbid within a single paragraph. But he has more digging to do in the human heart. The novel is hermetic in its singular occupation with the disastrous relationship between Doum and Will and the corollary romance between Liz and the married Leibowitz. Though all four have plausibly prominent roles in French culture, at times it appears as if no other figures of consequence exist, with secondary characters strutting too quickly across the stage."

== Thought ==
=== Form and Object ===
Form and Object can be grouped together with other works of speculative realism and object-oriented ontology by philosophers like Graham Harman and Manuel DeLanda. Garcia positions his work against "philosophies of access," which seek to theorize the limitations of subjective access to objective reality. Instead, Garcia proposes beginning to think about things before thinking about our conditions of access to those things. The book is divided into two parts: Book 1, titled "Formally", and Book 2, titled "Objectively". The first book proposes an ontology of a flat world, in which all things are seen as being equally things, whereas the second book describes more specific objects, like animals, class, and gender.

Graham Harman, in a review of the French edition of Form and Object, claimed that it is "an intricate piece of work by an emerging philosopher who is now a force to reckon with".

Nathan Brown criticized Form and Object for maintaining a division between objects and their conditions; for Brown, Garcia claims to solve the problems of our conditions of knowledge by fiat: Garcia simply resolves "to treat objects and things objectively while treating conditions of objectivity as secondary". Contrary to Garcia, following Alfred North Whitehead and Ray Brassier, Brown maintains that these two problems can never be separated: "Speculative philosophy sets out from and returns to the crossroads of metaphysics and epistemology; it has to travel both roads at once." Nonetheless, Brown argues that Garcia's work still deserves examination and attention. He claims that while Book I remains "conceptually fascinating", Book II becomes more problematic. Brown adds that, overall, "Form and Object would be a more persuasive treatise if it included only Book I, reserving the topics in Book II for treatment elsewhere, in greater detail and with greater precision." Ultimately, Brown concludes that "the originality and energy of Form and Object, and the lovely openness of the book's tone, make the differential, relational ontology it elaborates conceptually and affectively enticing."

== Works ==
=== Literary works ===
- La meilleure part des hommes (2008)
- Mémoires de la jungle (2010)
- En l'absence de classement final (2012)
- Les cordelettes de Browser (2012)
- Faber: Le destructeur (2013)
- 7 (2015)
- La Ligne (2016)
- Âmes (2020)

=== Philosophical works ===
- L'Image (2007)
- Nous, animaux et humains. Actualité de Jeremy Bentham (2011)
- Forme et objet: Un traité des choses (2011)
- Six Feet Under: Nos vies sans destin (2012)
- La vie intense. Une obsession moderne (2016)
- Nous (2016)
- Laisser être et rendre puissant (2023)

=== Works in English ===
- Hate: A Romance. Trans. Marion Duvert and Lorin Stein. New York: Faber and Faber, 2010.
- "Crossing Ways of Thinking: On Graham Harman's System and My Own." Parrhesia 16 (2013). 14–25.
- Form and Object: A Treatise on Things. Trans. Mark Allan Ohm and Jon Cogburn. Edinburgh: Edinburgh University Press, 2014.
- "Another Order of Time: Towards a Variable Intensity of the Now." Parrhesia 19 (2014). 1–13.
- The Life Intense: A Modern Obsession, Letting Be I. Trans. Abigail RayAlexander, Christopher RayAlexander, Jon Cogburn. Edinburgh: Edinburgh University Press, 2018.
- We Ourselves: The Politics of Us, Letting Be II. Trans. Christopher RayAlexander, Abigail RayAlexander, Jon Cogburn. Edinburgh: Edinburgh University Press, 2021.
- Architecture of the Possible. Ed. Jean-Marie Durand, Trans. Christopher RayAlexander, Abigail RayAlexander, Jon Cogburn. Edinburgh: Edinburgh University Press, 2021.
- Memories from the Jungle. Trans. Christopher Beach. Lincoln: University of Nebraska Press, 2025.

=== Edited works ===
- Edition with Pierre-Alexandre Fradet of the special issue "Réalisme spéculatif", in Spirale (Montréal), issue 255, winter 2016

=== Interviews ===
- Garcia, Tristan. Interview by Sandra Laugier. "Interview: Tristan Garcia". BOMB Magazine, 114, Winter 2011.
- Garcia, Tristan. Interview by Liam Jones. "Interview with Tristan Garcia". Figure/Ground. 28 September 2014.

== Sources ==
- Adams, Tim. "The Life Intense: A Modern Obsession - review." The Guardian. 24 September 2018.
- Biggs, Joanna. "Hate: A Romance by Tristan Garcia – review." The Guardian. 5 February 2011.
- Brown, Nathan. "Speculation at the Crossroads." Radical Philosophy 188 (Nov/Dec 2014). 47–50.
- Cogburn, Jon. Garcian Meditations: The Dialectics of Persistence in Form and Object. Edinburgh: Edinburgh University Press, 2017.
- Dickinson, Colby. Book Review: Form and Object: A Treatise on Things. The Heythrop Journal, 58, 4: 734–737, 2017.
- Erkan, Ekin. "Tristan Garcia's Electric Ontology: Thought and its Deracinated Image". Rhizomes: Cultural Studies in Emerging Knowledge, no. 36, 2020.
- Harman, Graham. "Object-Oriented France: The Philosophy of Tristan Garcia." continent 5.1 (2012), 6-21.
- Harman, Graham. "Tristan Garcia and the Thing-In-Itself." Parrhesia 16 (2013). 26–34.
- Nazaryan, Alexander. "Wasting Away". New York Times Sunday Book Review. 5 November 2010.
- Livingston, Paul. "Formal ontology and the flat world: a review of Tristan Garcia's Form and Object". Continental Philosophy Review 49, pp. 545–553, 2016/
- Poole, Steven. "The Life Intense by Tristan Garcia review - is there too much excitement in our lives?" The Guardian. 6 December 2018.
