= Pascal Michon =

French philosopher and historian (born 1959)

- Born: Pascal Michon; 1959 (age 66–67)
- Occupations: Philosopher, historian

Education
- Education: École Normale Supérieure, Paris 1 Panthéon-Sorbonne University, École des Hautes Études en Sciences Sociales

Pascal Michon is a French philosopher and historian born in 1959. A former student of the École normale supérieure de Saint-Cloud, he is a professeur agrégé and has a PhD degree in History.

He taught in Preparatory Classes for Grandes Écoles, in various foreign universities and at the Collège international de philosophie. He is the creator and host of the website and the publishing house RHUTHMOS, both dedicated to rhythmanalytic and rhythmological studies.

His work is organized around four main axes: 1. The history of the subject and the individual in the West; 2. Forms of individuation and power in the era of globalized capitalism; 3. The genealogy of the concept of rhythm in the sciences of man and society, in philosophy and in poetics; 4. Language theory and literary theory.

== Publications ==
=== Books ===
- À la recherche de la rythmanalyse, Paris, Rhuthmos, 2026, coll. « Rythmanalyses », 312 p.
- À la recherche de la rythmologie, Paris, Rhuthmos, 2026, coll. « Rythmologies », 338 p.
- Rhuthmologie. 2. Le groupement rhuthmique naturaliste, Paris, Rhuthmos, 2025, coll. « Essais », 121 p.
- Rhuthmologie. 1. Une nouvelle perspective pour le XXI^{e} siècle, Paris, Rhuthmos, 2025, coll. « Essais », 250 p.
- Individu et sujet en Occident. Pour une anthropologie historique rhuthmique, Paris, Rhuthmos, 2024, coll. « Essais », 108 p.
- Individu et sujet en Occident, 2. Dumont, Elias, Meyerson, Vernant, Paris, Rhuthmos, 2024, coll. «Anthropologies historiques », 428 p.
- Individu et sujet en Occident, 1. Mauss, Huizinga, Groethuysen, Paris, Rhuthmos, 2024, coll. «Anthropologies historiques », 280 p.
- Problèmes de rythmanalyse, vol. 2, Paris, Rhuthmos, 2022, coll. « Rythmanalyses », 256 p.
- Problèmes de rythmanalyse, vol. 1, Paris, Rhuthmos, 2022, coll. « Rythmanalyses », 270 p.
- Elements of Rhythmology. V. A Rhythmic Constellation – The 1980s, Paris, Rhuthmos, 2021, coll. « Rythmologies », 442 p.
- Elements of Rhythmology. IV. A Rhythmic Constellation – The 1970s, Paris, Rhuthmos, 2021, coll. « Rythmologies », 312 p.
- Elements of Rhythmology. III. The Spread of Metron – From the 1840s to the 1910s, Paris, Rhuthmos, 2019, coll. « Rythmologies », 400 p.
- Elements of Rhythmology. II. From the Renaissance to the 19th Century, Paris, Rhuthmos, 2018, coll. « Rythmologies », 338 p.
- Elements of Rhythmology. I. Antiquity, Paris, Rhuthmos, 2018, coll. « Rythmologies », 372 p.
- Rythmologie baroque. Spinoza, Leibniz, Diderot, Paris, Rhuthmos, 2015, coll. « Rythmologies », 501 p.
- Marcel Mauss retrouvé. Origines de l'anthropologie du rythme, Paris, Rhuthmos, 1re éd. 2010, 2de éd. 2015, coll. « Rythmologies », 130 p.
- Fragments d’inconnu. Pour une histoire du sujet, Paris, Le Cerf, 2010, coll. « Passages » directed by J. Benoist, 251 p.
- Les Rythmes du politique. Démocratie et capitalisme mondialisé, Paris, Rhuthmos, 1re éd. 2007, 2de éd. 2015, coll. « Rythmanalyses », 316 p.
- Rythme, pouvoir, mondialisation, Paris, Rhuthmos, 1re éd. 2005, 2de éd. 2016, coll. « Rythmologies », 492 p.
- Poétique d’une anti-anthropologie. L’herméneutique de Gadamer, Paris, Vrin, 2000, coll. « Problèmes et controverses » directed by J.-F. Courtine, 256 p.
- Éléments d’une histoire du sujet, Paris, Kimé, 1999, coll. « Philosophie-épistémologie », 208 p.

=== Collective works ===
- Surveiller et Punir de Michel Foucault. Regards critiques 1975-1979 (with P. Artières, J.-F. Bert, P. Lascoumes, L. Paltrinieri, J. Revel, J.-C. Zancarini) Caen, Presses universitaires de Caen, 2011, 382 p.
- Les Mots et les Choses de Michel Foucault. Regards critiques 1966-1968 (with P. Artières, J.-F. Bert, P. Chevallier, M. Potte-Bonneville, J. Revel, J.-C. Zancarini), Caen, Presses universitaires de Caen, 2009, 381 p.
- Archives de l’infamie, (Collectif Maurice Florence – with P. Artières, J.-F. Bert, M. Potte-Bonneville, J. Revel), Paris, Les Prairies ordinaires, 2009, 156 p.
- Zones urbaines partagées, (with M. Lussaut, T. Sauvadet, E. During, B. LaBelle, Y.-A. Bois), Saint-Denis, Synesthésie, 2008, 94 p.
- Les contradictions du travail à l'ère du global, (with J.-C. Aguerre, B. Ogilvie, P.-M. Menger), Saint-Denis, Synesthésie, 2008, 92 p.
- Foucault dans tous ses éclats, (with A. Brossat, F. Carnevale, Ph. Hauser), Paris, L’Harmattan, 2005, 234 p.
- Henri Meschonnic, la pensée et le poème, (with G. Dessons et S. Martin), Paris, In Press, 2005, 276 p.
- Avec Henri Meschonnic. Les Gestes dans la voix, (ed.) La Rochelle, Rumeur des Âges, 2003, 149 p.

=== Translations ===
- G. Sergi, L’Idée de Moyen Âge, Paris, Flammarion, coll. Champs, 2000, 112 p., (with C. Paul).
- R. Bodei, La Philosophie au XX^{e} siècle, Paris, Flammarion, coll. Champs, 1999, 264 p., (with C. Paul).
