= François Noudelmann =

French philosopher (born 1958)

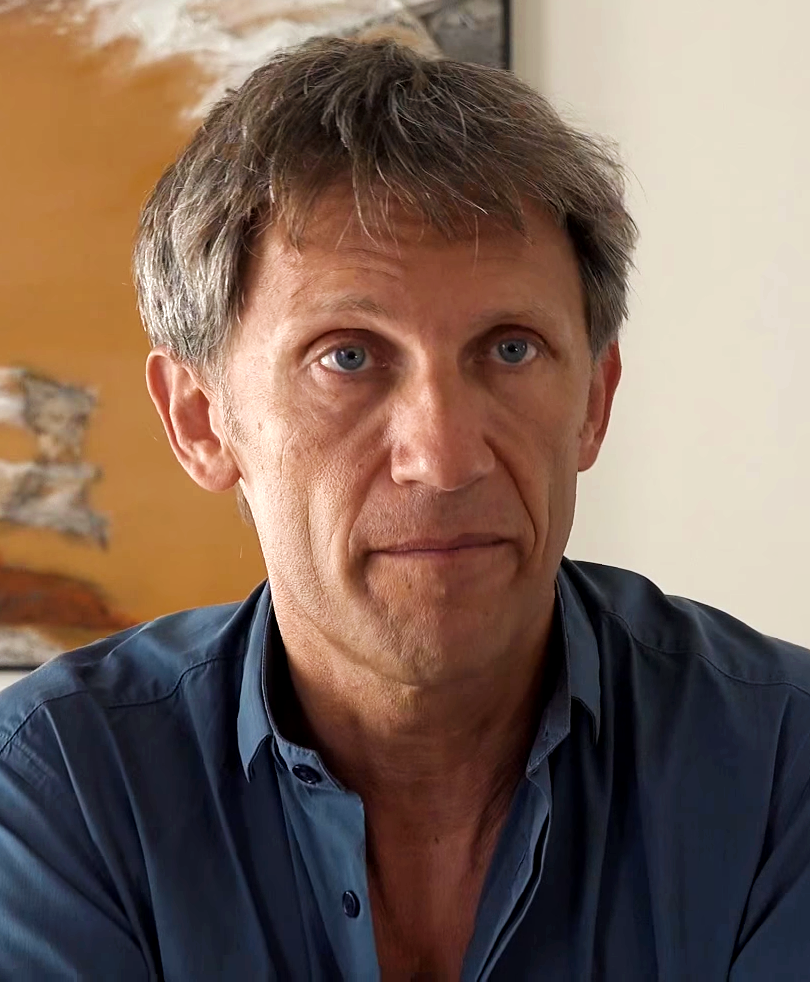
- François Noudelmann in 2015
- Born: 1958 (age 67–68)

Philosophical work
- Era: 20th-century philosophy
- Region: Western philosophy
- School: Continental philosophy,
- Main interests: Political philosophy, literature

François Noudelmann (born 1958) is a French philosopher, university professor and radio producer.

François Noudelmann is currently a professor at New York University, emeritus at the Paris 8 University Vincennes-Saint-Denis, and previously European Graduate School in Saas-Fee (Switzerland). He is a member of the Institut Universitaire de France. Between 2001 and 2004, he was the director of the Collège International de Philosophie (Ciph) in Paris. Since 2019, he runs La Maison française at NYU.

Between 2002 and 2013, Noudelmann produced and hosted weekly and daily radio shows on France-Culture, notably Les Vendredis de la philosophie and Macadam philo. From 2008 to 2009 Noudelmann coordinated and participated in the blog project 24 heures philo (24 hours Philosophy) for the French newspaper Libération, combining news, critical theory and philosophy.

In 2009 and 2010 Noudelmann produced and hosted Je l'entends comme je l'aime, a Sunday evening radio show on France Culture which draws on the many relationships between music and the arts, philosophy, literature, poetry, science, and more. Previous guests have included Hélène Cixous, Jean-Luc Nancy, Alain Badiou, Slavoj Zizek among many others. He hosted a daily program called Le Journal de la philosophie between 2010 and 2013.

Noudelmann's first novel Les Enfants de Cadillac was published in 2021. The book was shortlisted for the Prix Femina, the Prix André Malraux, and the Prix Goncourt. Since Noudelmann's partner, Camille Laurens, is a member of the Goncourt committee, the book was set aside from the competition. The académie Goncourt has since changed its rules, excluding competitors with ties to its members.

== Books ==
- Peut-on encore sauver la vérité ?, Max Milo, 2024
  - Can We Make Truth Great Again?, Max Milo, 2025 ISBN 978-2315022694
- Les Enfants de Cadillac, Gallimard, 2021 ISBN 9782072945373
- Un tout autre Sartre, Gallimard, 2020 ISBN 9782072887109
- Penser avec les oreilles, Max Milo, 2019 ISBN 978-2-31500-893-3
- Édouard Glissant. L'Identité généreuse, Flammarion, 2018 ISBN 978-2-081423-96-1
- L'Entretien du Monde (with Édouard Glissant), PUV, 2018 ISBN 978-2-842928-21-6
- Le Génie du mensonge, Max Milo, 2015, paperback Pocket 2017 ISBN 978-2-26626720-5
  - The Genious of Lies, Max Milo, 2024 ISBN 978-2315012008
- Les Airs de famille. Une philosophie des affinités, Gallimard, 2012 ISBN 978-2-07013576-9
- Le Toucher des philosophes. Sartre, Nietzsche et Barthes au piano, Gallimard, 2008 (grand prix des Muses 2009). ISBN 2-07-012195-X The Philosopher's Touch, Columbia University Press, 2012, ISBN 9780231527200
- Hors de moi, Léo Scheer, 2006. ISBN 2-7561-0020-X
- Samuel Beckett, with B. Clément, Adpf publications, 2006. ISBN 978-2-914935-64-7
- Jean-Paul Sartre, Adpf publications, 2005. ISBN 978-2-914935-36-4
- Pour en finir avec la généalogie, Léo Scheer, 2004. ISBN 978-2-915280-58-6
- Avant-gardes et modernité, Hachette, 2000. ISBN 978-2-01-145286-3
- Beckett ou La scène du pire, Honoré Champion, 1998. ISBN 978-2-7453-2141-1
- Image et absence: Essai sur le regard, L'Harmattan, 1998. ISBN 978-2-7384-6623-5
- Sartre: L'incarnation imaginaire, L'Harmattan, 1996. ISBN 978-2-7384-4010-5
- La Culture et l'homme, avec G. Barrère et MP Lachaud, Dunod, 1994. ISBN 978-2-10-002023-2
- Huis clos et Les mouches de Jean-Paul Sartre, Gallimard, 1993, rééd. 2006. ISBN 2-07-038661-9

=== In conversation with ===
- Penser l'avenir, with André Gorz, La Découverte, 2019. ISBN 978-2-34804342-0
- L'Entretien du monde, with Édouard Glissant, PUV, 2018. ISBN 978-2-84292821-6

== Other publications ==
- Archipels Glissant, with F. Simasotchi-Bronès and Y. Toma, PUV, 2020. ISBN 978-2-37924-085-0
- Soundings and Soundscapes, with S. Kay, Paragraph, Edinburgh University Press, 2018. ISSN 0264-8334
- Édouard Glissant, la pensée du détour, with F. Simasotchi-Bronès, Armand Colin/Dunod, 2014.
- Filiation and its discontents, with R. Harvey and E-A Kaplan, SUNY-SB papers, 2009.
- Dictionnaire Sartre, with G. Philippe, Honoré Champion, 2004.
- Politique et filiation, with R. Harvey and E-A Kaplan, Kimé, 2004.
- Les 20 ans du Collège international de philosophie with A. Soulez, Rue Descartes, P.U.F., 2004.
- Politiques de la communauté, with G. Bras, P.U.F., 2003.
- Le matériau, voir et entendre, with A. Soulez, P.U.F., 2002.
- L’étranger dans la mondialité, P.U.F., 2002.
- Roland Barthes après Roland Barthes, with F. Gaillard, P.U.F., 2002.
- Scène et image, with D. Moncond'huy, La Licorne, 2000.
- Ponge : matière, matériau, matérialisme, with N. Barberger and H. Scepi, La Licorne, 2000.
- Suite, série, séquence, with D. Moncond'huy, 1998.
- Le corps a découvert, S.T.H., 1992.
- La nature, de l'identité à la liberté, S.T.H., 1991.
