= Éditions de l'éclat =

- Status: SARL since 1988
- Founded: 2 February 1985
- Founders: Michel Valensi & Patricia Farazzi
- Country of origin: France
- Headquarters location: 11th arrondissement of Paris
- Distribution: Harmonia Mundi (France/Belgium); Dimédia (Canada); Servidis (Switzerland)
- Nonfiction topics: Philosophy, Jewish thought
- Fiction genres: literature, poetry
- Official website: https://www.lyber-eclat.net

Éditions de l'éclat is an independent publishing company based in Paris that was founded in 1985 by Michel Valensi & Patricia Farazzi.

The company is considered unique for its penchant for publishing "across genre barriers." They are also notable for launching "Lyber éclat", a digital publishing platform, in the year 2000, on their website. Valensi has been a strong advocate for digital publishing on the basis that it can promote a book through expanded distribution and format compatibility. When he launched Lyber, he was especially concerned about the "fake book" market, a problem he felt could be combated by the transparency offered by Lyber. The software invites readers to buy the physical book if they like it and directs them to bookstores that carry it. Readers can also leave comments for the author using Lyber. Valensi argued that Lyber has economic benefits too, as the transparency and engagement encouraged through Lyber could devalue the "commercial trash" that traditional publishers might otherwise rely on for sustainability.

They won the Publisher's Prize from Les Rencontres Philosophiques de Monaco in 2017.

== Authors ==
- Walter Benjamin
- Jean-Louis Bertocchi
- Philippe Blouin
- Jean-Luc Bourgeois, screenwriter for Mein Name ist Bach
- Christoph Bouton
- Jacques Bouveresse
- Giorgio Colli
- Paul Engelmann
- Freddy Gomez
- Michael Łowy
- Jan Lukasiewicz
- Norman Malcolm
- Jean-Clet Martin
- Henri Meschonnic
- Mazzino Montinari
- André Neher
- Constantino Nivola
- Gershom Scholem
- Ludwig Siep
- Barbara Stiegler
- Michel Surya
- Xavier Tilliette
- Imre Tóth
- Michel Valensi, founder & director, author of Vies et œuvres de Costantino Nivola
- Anna Waisman
- Ludwig Wittgenstein
- Elliot R. Wolfson

== Collections ==
- Philosophie imaginaire (1985)
- Paraboles (1985)
- Polemos (1989)
- Tiré à part (1989–2009), created and directed by Jean-Pierre Cometti
- Lire les philosophies (1992)
- Premiers Secours (2000)
- La Bibliothèque des Fondations (2006), created under the auspices of the Fondation du judaïsme français Foundation for French Judaism and with the support of the Fondation pour la Mémoire de la Shoah
- Terra cognita (2009), collection directed by Alexandre Laumonier
- Éclats (2011)
- L’éclat/poche (2015)
