= Collège international de philosophie =

Education institute

- Founded: 1983
- Founders: Jacques Derrida, François Châtelet, Jean-Pierre Faye, Dominique Lecourt
- Purpose: Philosophy education, open education, research
- Location: 5th arrondissement of Paris
- Method: Seminars, publishing and communication (periodicals, podcasts, books, social media)
- Website: ciph.org

The Collège international de philosophie (French pronunciation: [kɔlɛʒ ɛ̃tɛʁnɑsjɔnal də filɔzɔfi]; CIPh) is located in the 5th arrondissement of Paris. It is a tertiary education institute placed under the trusteeship of the French Ministry of Higher Education and Research and chartered under the French 1901 Law on Associations.

== History ==
It was co-founded in 1983 by Jacques Derrida, François Châtelet, Jean-Pierre Faye and Dominique Lecourt in an attempt to re-think the teaching of philosophy in France, and to liberate it from undue institutional authority (most of all from the university). Its financing is mainly through public funds in the form of grants from the Ministry of Research and the Ministry of Education.”

== Governance ==
The chair or "directors of program" is competitively elected for 6 years (non renewable), following an international open call for proposals (every third year). Proposals are free and directors are elected after a collegial, peer review of their value for philosophy. The College recognizes that philosophy is better served by being located at "intersections" such as Philosophy/Science, or Philosophy/Law. Proposals must respond to this exigency of "intersection" according to the wishes of Jacques Derrida. The College has few registered students, who may receive the diplôme du Collège international de philosophie, which is not a university degree but may be, in some cases, validated by French or foreign universities. Otherwise, attendance to seminars is open and free.

== Raison d'être (mission and purpose) ==
According to Derrida, he was inspired by the Colloque de Cerisy study center to found this new institution, in the midst of governmental threats on the teaching of philosophy in the last class (Note: The French lycée is three years: Seconde, Prèmiere, and Terminale. See Secondary_education_in_France#Lycée.) Thus was created this College, "from a non-governmental origin, with an international span, an institution which is not destined to oppose itself, but to balance, question, open, and occupy margins; where we would privilege infrequent approaches or approaches yet unconventionalized by the university, new objects, new themes, new fields; where we would treat more of intersections than of academic disciplines."

== Presidents of the assembly of directors ==
- Jacques Derrida
- Jean-François Lyotard
- François Jullien
- Jean-Claude Milner
- François Noudelmann
- Isabelle Alfandary (2013–2019)

== Current directors ==
- Elena Anastasaki
- Manola Antonioli
- Guillaume Artois-Bouvet
- Quentin Badaire
- Sina Badiei
- Charles Boxant
- Livio Boni
- Vanessa Brito
- Jean-Jacques Cadet
- Rosaria Caldarone
- Raffaele Carbone
- Gaetano Chiurazzi
- Hugues Choplin
- Alexandre Chèvremont
- Laura Cremonesi
- Rémy David
- Alessandro De Lima Francisco
- Joana Desplat-Roger
- Héctor G. Castano
- Marc Goldschmit
- Lorena Grigoletto
- Emmanuel Guez
- Joëlle Hansel
- Étienne Helmer
- Céline Hervet
- Éric Hoppenot
- Romaric Jannel
- Abbed Kanoor
- Igor Krtolica
- Alexis Lavis
- Anna Longo
- Cécile Malaspina
- Cédric Molino-Machetto
- Mara Montanaro
- Laura Moscarelli
- Michel Olivier
- Alain Patrick Olivier
- Chiara Palermo
- Xavier Pavie
- Éric Puisais
- Stéphanie Péraud-Puigségur
- Julien Rabachou
- Stéphanie Ronchewski Degorre
- Michele Saporiti
- Diane Scott
- Vicky Skoumbi
- Angelo Vannini
- Pauline Vermeren
- Raphaël Zagury-Orly
- Barbara Zauli

== Past directors ==
- Giorgio Agamben
- Alain Badiou
- Sidi Mohamed Barkat
- Geoffrey Bennington
- Barbara Cassin
- François Châtelet
- Joseph Cohen (2004-2010)
- José Gil
- Olivier LeCour Grandmaison
- Robert Harvey
- Natacha Michel
- Pascal Michon
- Antonio Negri
- Catherine Perret
- Philippe-Joseph Salazar

== See also ==
- Collège philosophique
- Université populaire de Caen
