= Jock Rundell =

Scottish footballer

Personal information
- Full name: John Rundell
- Date of birth: 8 February 1895
- Place of birth: Larkhall, Scotland
- Date of death: 25 August 1973 (aged 78)
- Place of death: Caernarfon, Wales
- Height: 5 ft 10 in (1.78 m)
- Position: Goalkeeper

Senior career*
Years	Team	Apps	(Gls)
1914–1916	Larkhall Thistle		
1916–1925	Motherwell	266	(0)
1924	→ Royal Albert (loan)		
1924–1925	→ Arthurlie (loan)	24	(0)
1925–1926	Arthurlie	33	(1)
Total		323	(1)
- * Club domestic league appearances and goals

John Rundell (8 February 1895 – 25 August 1973) was a Scottish footballer who played as a goalkeeper, primarily for Motherwell where he spent close to 10 years (during several of which the team finished in the top five positions in the Scottish Football League table), eventually being replaced by Allan McClory.

He then moved to Arthurlie, where he played for a season alongside younger brother George, a wing half. He moved to North Wales in later life.

Jock is credited with scoring a league goal for Arthurlie during the 1925–26 Scottish Division Two campaign, but the nature of this is unconfirmed, possibly being a 'souvenir' penalty in an unimportant fixture when it was known his career was nearing its end, or perhaps an error with a goal scored by George but credited to the better-known Rundell sibling.
