= Éditions Hermann =

French publisher

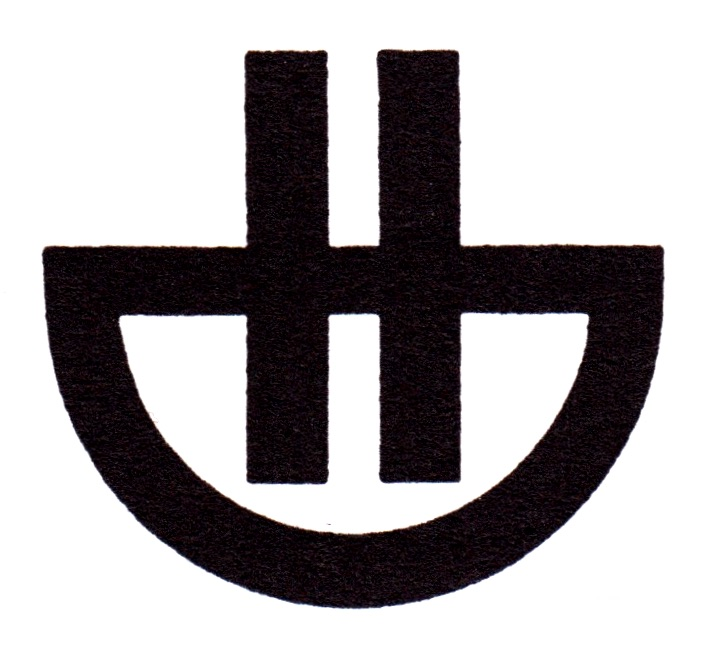
- Logo of Éditions Hermann
- Founded: 1876
- Founder: Arthur Hermann
- Country of origin: France
- Headquarters location: Paris
- Key people: Arthur Cohen
- Publication types: Books
- Official website: www.editions-hermann.fr

Éditions Hermann (French: [ɛʁman]) is a French publishing house founded in 1876, by the French professor of mathematics Arthur Hermann. It publishes books on science and the arts.

== Éléments de mathématique ==
Hermann is noted for publishing several volumes of the Éléments de mathématique, a treatise in pure mathematics by the pseudonymous collective Nicolas Bourbaki. Publication of the series began in the 1930s, the decade when the Bourbaki group was founded; at that time, Hermann was led by Enrique Freymann, a friend of the collective who agreed to publish volumes of the group's project, despite financial risk. During the 1950s and 1960s, installments of the series appeared regularly, and sold well. The Éléments became an influential series in 20th century mathematics, and Hermann benefitted in its role as publisher. Decades later, during the 1970s, Bourbaki and Hermann entered an extended legal battle over matters of copyright and royalty payment. The suit was resolved toward the end of the decade, with the result that Bourbaki retained copyright of its work and volumes of the Éléments would be printed by other publishers, going forward.

Although Hermann lost publishing rights to the Éléments, the first, historical editions of the work bear its imprint.

== Book series ==
- Actualités mathématiques
- Actualités scientifiques et industrielles — founded in 1930 by Louis de Broglie
- Enseignement des sciences
- Méthodes
- Miroirs de l'art
- Ouverture médicale
- Savoir
- Travaux en cours
- Visions des sciences
