= Librairie philosophique J. Vrin =

Bookshop in Paris

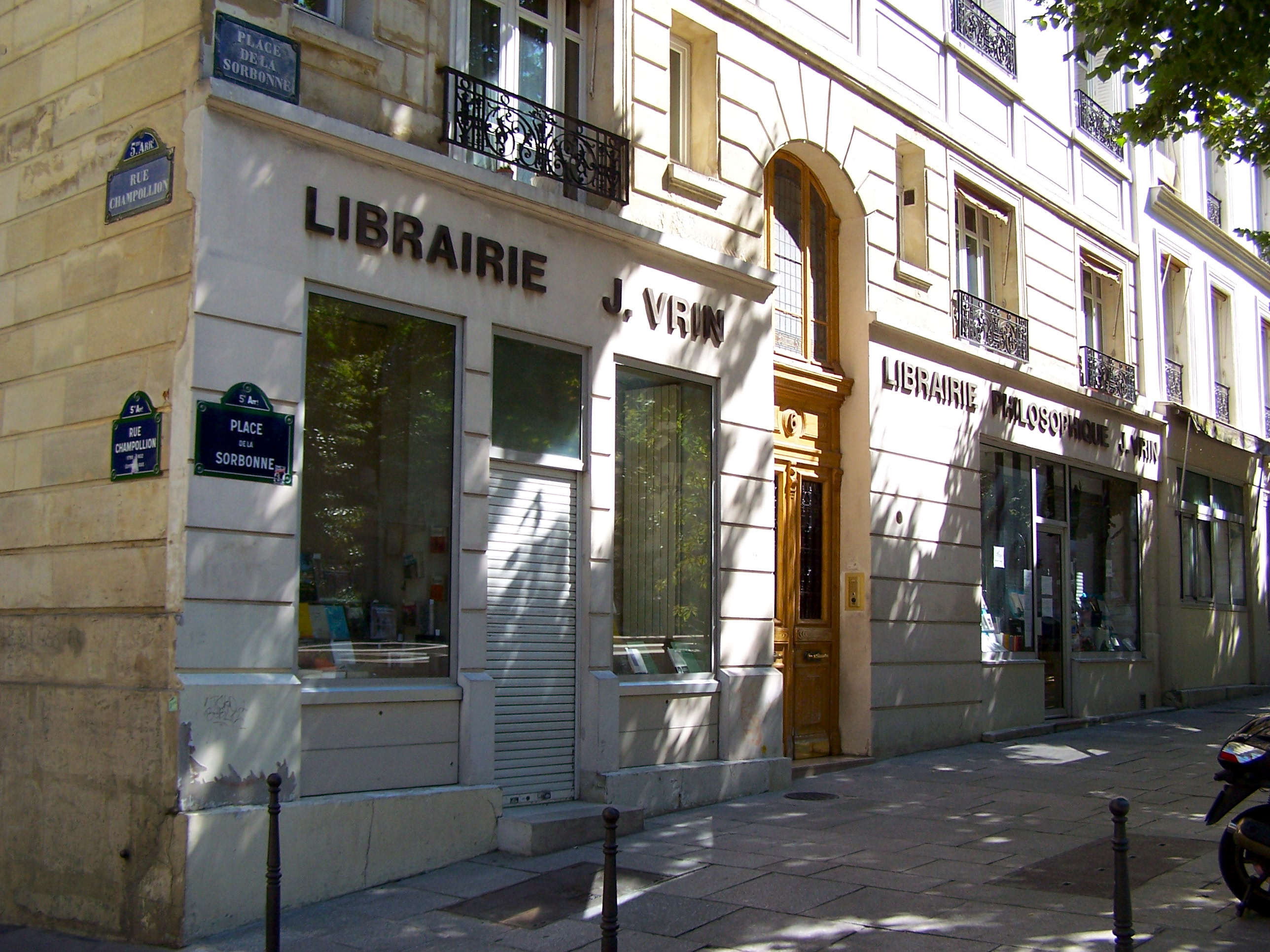
The Librairie philosophique J. Vrin in 2013.

The Librairie philosophique Vrin, more formally known as La Librairie philosophique J. Vrin or simply Vrin, is a bookstore situated at 6, place de la Sorbonne in the 5th arrondissement of Paris, (Note: There is a second location at 8, place de l'Église) and a French publishing house specializing in the publication of works of philosophy. Joseph Vrin founded the bookstore in 1911, to which a publishing house was added in 1926.

== Collections ==
J. Vrin is the official publisher of meetings and notebooks compiled by Les Rencontres Philosophiques de Monaco. In 2016, the house Vrin won the Mention Honorifique (after 2024, redesignated the Prix d'Éditeur) selected annually by PhiloMonaco.

Vrin (variously called "chez Vrin" or "Les Éditions Vrin" in the press) is arranged in Collections:

- Philosophy & History of Philosophy
  - Ancient Philosophy
  - Medieval Philosophy
  - Philosophy of the Renaissance
- Logic and Epistemology
- Aesthetics and Philosophy of Art

== Principal original authors ==
- Émile Boutroux (1845-1921), member of the Académie des sciences morales et politiques & member of the Académie française. He held the chair of history of modern philosophy at the Sorbonne.
- Victor Delbos (1862-1916), author of several reference works in the history of philosophy and member of l'Académie des sciences morales et politiques.
- Émile Bréhier (1876-1952), Writer, historian, and professor of the history of philosophy. He specialized in Stoicism and Neoplatonism..
- Étienne Gilson (1884-1978), professor at the Collège de France and member of the Académie française, specialized in medieval philosophy.
- Gaston Bachelard (1884-1962), one of the main représentatives of historical epistemology. He influenced Koyré, Althusser, Canguilhem, Simondon, Foucault, Dagognet, Bourdieu.
- Henri Gouhier (1898-1994), specialized in Cartesianism, metaphysics and French spiritualism.

== Principal modern authors ==
- Georges Canguilhem (1904-1995), specialized in epistemology and History of Science, notable student of Gaston Bachelard and professor of Michel Foucault.
- Éric Weil (1904-1977), philosopher, historian of philosophy (Aristote, Kant, Hegel). His thinking revolved around the historicity of finite existence and the fragility of freedom.
- Jean-Paul Sartre (1905-1980), philosopher, writer, representative of the current existentialism.
- Emmanuel Levinas (1906-1995), philosopher, introducer of the thought of Heidegger and of Husserl en France.
- Pierre Hadot (1922-2010), historian of philosophy and Ancient philosophy.
- François Dagognet (1924-2015), specialized in the history of science, epistemology, and also in Aesthetics and Ethics.
- Michel Foucault (1926-1984), professor at the Collège de France and a leading figure in the French Theory.

== Principal contemporary authors ==
- Monique Dixsaut, specializes in Plato, professor at Paris 1 Panthéon-Sorbonne University.
- Jean-Luc Marion, philosopher, representative of the "theological turning point " of French phenomenology, member of the Académie française.
- Bernard Bourgeois, specializes in Hegel, professor emeritus at the Sorbonne (Paris-I) and member of the Académie des sciences morales et politiques.
- Alain de Libera, historian of philosophy, specializes in medieval philosophy, professor at the Collège de France.
- Jean-François Courtine, historian of philosophy and specializes in the history of ontology, professor at Paris Sorbonne IV.
- Renaud Barbaras, professor of phenomenology at Paris 1.
- Jocelyn Benoist, professor at the Sorbonne (Paris-I), specializes in phenomenology and of the confrontation with analytic philosophy.
- Sandra Laugier, professor at the Sorbonne (Paris-I), member of the institut universitaire de France, chevalière of the légion d'honneur, specialist of the philosophy of language and the philosophy of knowledge.
- Dimitri El Murr, professor of the history of philosophy at the École normale supérieure (Ulm) and specialist of Plato.

== Periodicals ==
Archives d'Histoire Doctrinale et Littéraire du Moyen Âge (1929)

- Archives d'histoire doctrinale et littéraire du Moyen Age
- Revue des Sciences philosophiques et théologiques, founded in 1907, edited by Rémi Chéno.
- Cercle herméneutique
- La revue Cahiers philosophiques
- La revue Annale de l'Institut de philosophie de the University of Brussels, collection edited by Thierry Lenain
- La revue Bulletin de la Société française de philosophie

== See also ==
- Editis
- Lagardère Group
- Collège de France
- Collège international de philosophie
- Institut Universitaire de France
- Les Rencontres Philosophiques de Monaco
