= Critical Horizons =

- Discipline: Social theory, philosophy
- Language: English
- Edited by: Jay Bernstein, Jean-Philippe Deranty, Danielle Petherbridge, Emmanuel Renault, John Rundell

Publication details
- History: 2000-present
- Publisher: Routledge
- Frequency: Quarterly

Standard abbreviations
- ISO 4: Crit. Horiz.

Indexing
- ISSN: 1440-9917 (print); 1568-5160 (web)
- LCCN: 00227174
- OCLC no.: 915911362

Links
- Journal homepage; Online access; Online archive

Critical Horizons: A Journal of Philosophy and Social Theory is a peer-reviewed academic journal covering philosophy, aesthetics, and critical social theory. It is published by Routledge and the editors-in-chief are Jay Bernstein, Jean-Philippe Deranty, Emmanuel Renault, and John Rundell. It was published by Brill Publishers in the past.

== Abstracting and indexing ==
The journal is abstracted and indexed in:

- Emerging Sources Citation Index
- Philosophy Research Index
- The Philosopher's Index
- Proquest databases
- Sociological Abstracts
- Scopus
