= Rwandan literature =

Rwandan literature is literature both oral and written in Kinyarwanda, English, or French, particularly by citizens of Rwanda. Since the aftermath of the 1994 Rwandan genocide, much of Rwandan literature has focused on documenting and describing the trauma many experienced.

== History ==
Rwanda's literary history is largely an oral one. Before the 20th century, Rwanda was a non-literate society, preferring oral tradition to written literature. German and Belgian missionaries were the first to document Rwandan history and mythology through a written medium.

The traditional texts were classed in two main categories: more formal, royal documents, which are described as 'official tradition', and the non-formal, popular literature. The distinction between these categories is based on whether or not the literature was controlled officially, rather than denoting any sort of value judgment regarding the content. To this day, storytelling and public speaking are much admired, and good storytellers are respected in society.

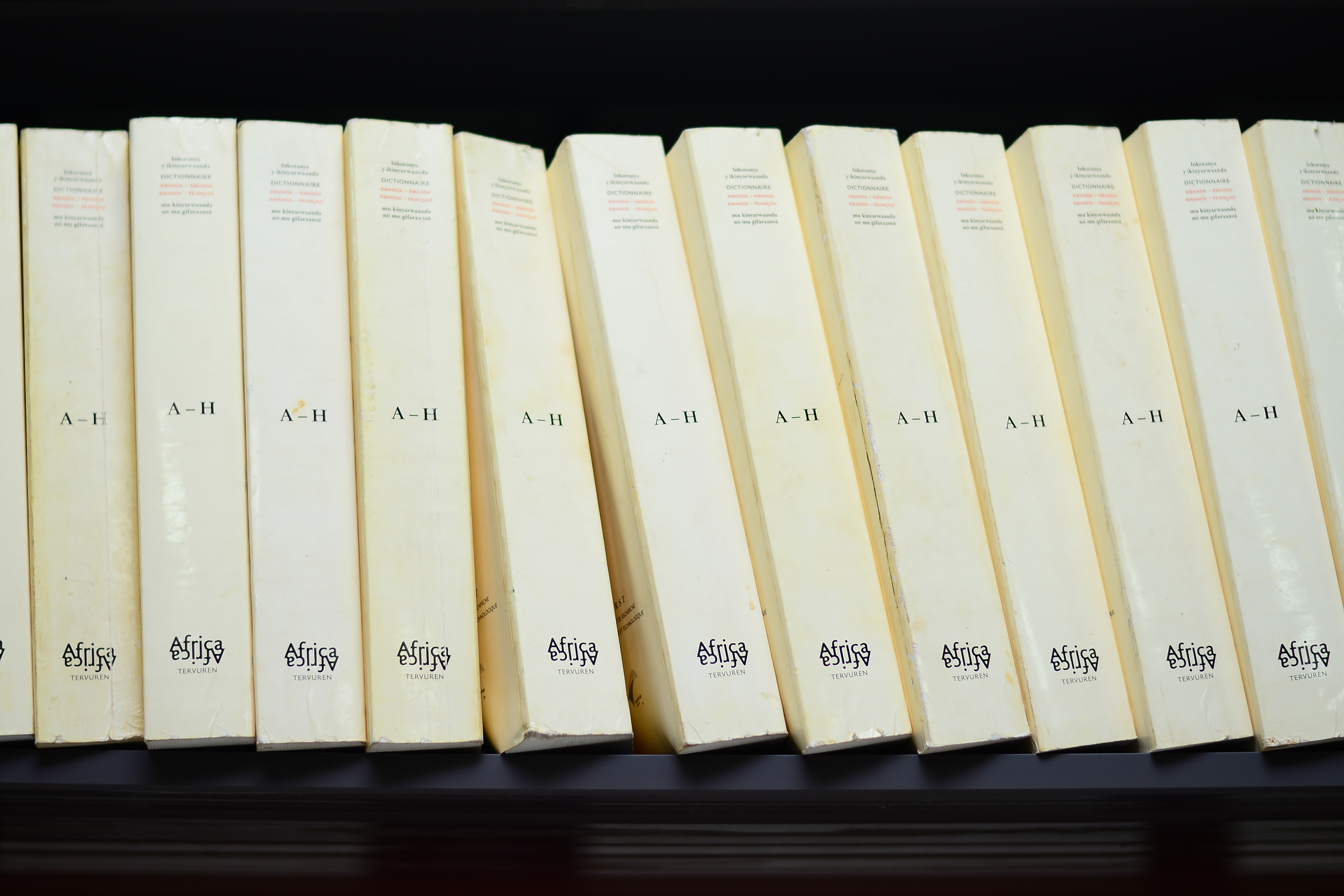
Dictionaries in Kinyarwanda to French in the National Library of Rwanda

Very little literature has been written in Kinyarwanda (the official language of Rwanda), with French typically being the language of high education and schooling. This divide has created a diglossia in Rwandan society, with Kinyarwanda the language of the home and French the language of the government. In an effort to change this norm, the clergyman and historian Alexis Kagame (1912–1981) researched the oral history of Rwanda and published a number of volumes of poetry and Rwandan mythology in Kinyarwanda. From 1943 to 1966, Kagame published a large number of Kinyarwanda-language books, as well as works of translation into Kinyarwanda.

On the topic of Rwandan French-language literature, Saverio Naigiziki is widely regarded as the first Francophone Rwandan author. He wrote an autobiography, Escapade rwandaise (Diary of a Clerk in his Thirtieth Year) and a novel, L'Optimiste (The Optimist), about the marriage of a Hutu man and a Tutsi woman.

== Current status ==
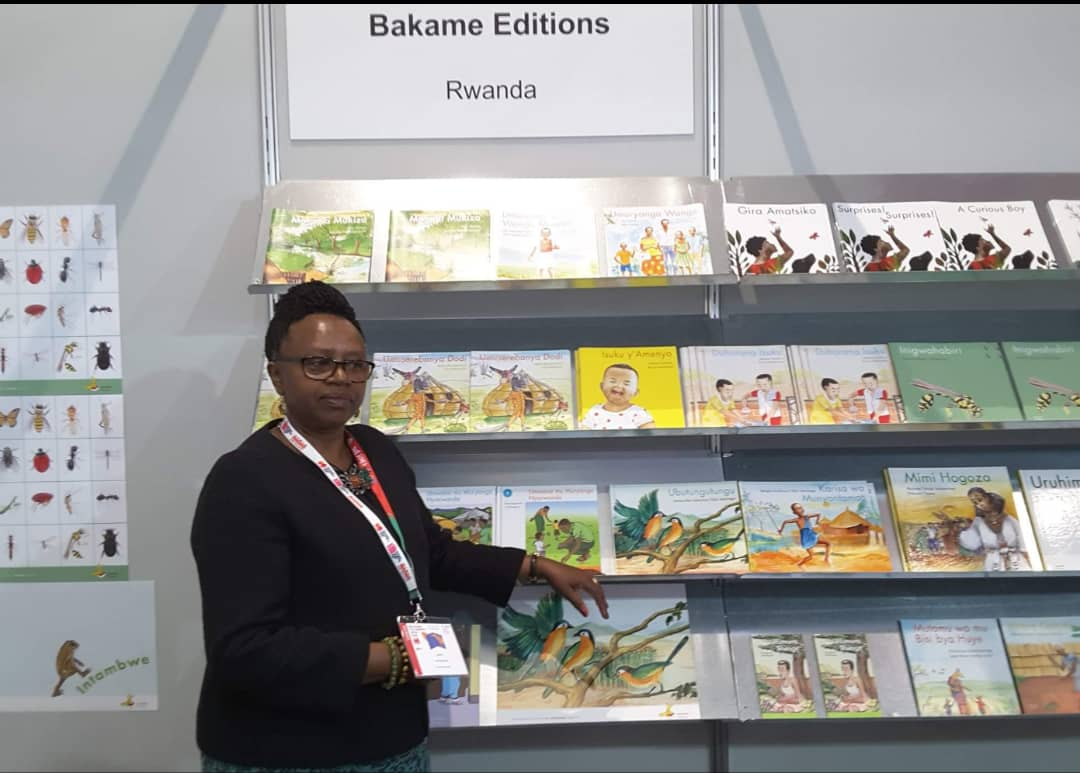
Gyr-Ukunda in front of a shelf of Éditions Bakame children's books

Agnès Gyr-Ukunda founded Éditions Bakame in 1995 while watching the Rwandan genocide from afar in Switzerland. Gyr-Ukunda wanted to establish a literary canon of children's books to support traumatized youth in their native language, Kinyarwanda.

In 2015, Louise Umutoni founded Huza Press, a Kigali-based publishing house. Huza Press runs Rwanda’s first prize for fiction, and awards winners with a cash prize and mentorship opportunities. According to Umutoni, Rwanda’s reading culture is less established than in neighboring countries like Kenya and Uganda, a fact which she wants to work to change. Huza Press publishes in English, French, and Kinyarwanda.

In 2018, Huza Press, Kwani Trust, and No Bindings, founded RadioBook Rwanda, a literary imprint that uses the multimedia mediums of art, written word, and audio. The audio format reflects Rwanda's traditional oral storytelling history, making the books more accessible to all readers.

In recent years, young Rwandan authors born after the 1994 genocide have been writing a new form of Rwandan fiction. Dominique Alonga's Tracing Cracks: A Rwandan Story details contemporary life in Kigali.

Scholastique Mukasonga is one of today's most prolific Rwandan authors. She emigrated to France two years before the 1994 genocide, and her fiction focuses mainly on exploring the Rwanda she remembers from her childhood.

== Post-genocide literature ==
In the aftermath of the 1994 genocide, many Rwandan authors have written books and novels in an effort to grapple with their country's history. Benjamin Sehene (b. 1959) wrote Le Piège ethnique (The Ethnic Trap) (1999), a study of what led to the genocide. He also wrote Le Feu sous la soutane (Fire under the Cassock) (2005), an historical novel inspired by the true story of a Hutu Catholic priest, Father Wenceslas Munyeshyaka, who offered protection to Tutsi refugees in his church before sexually exploiting the women and participating in massacres.

Survivors of the Rwandan genocide have written numerous memoirs and fictionalized accounts of their experiences. Memoirs include Immaculée Ilibagiza's 2006 Left to Tell: Discovering God Amidst the Rwandan Holocaust, Eugénie Musayidire's Mein Stein spricht (My Stone Speaks), and Yolande Mukagasana's La mort ne veut pas de moi (Not My Time to Die). Othe selections include Life and Death in Nyamata by Omar Ndizeye, Denise Uwimana’s From Red Earth, and Frida Umuhoza's Frida: Chosen to Die: Destined to Live.

Rwandan literature has been particularly of note to Genocide studies and for genocide awareness campaigns. Laurette Annely Akaliza's Wet Under the Rainbow follows contemporary Rwandan youth as they grapple with intergenerational trauma.

=== Rwandan diaspora literature ===
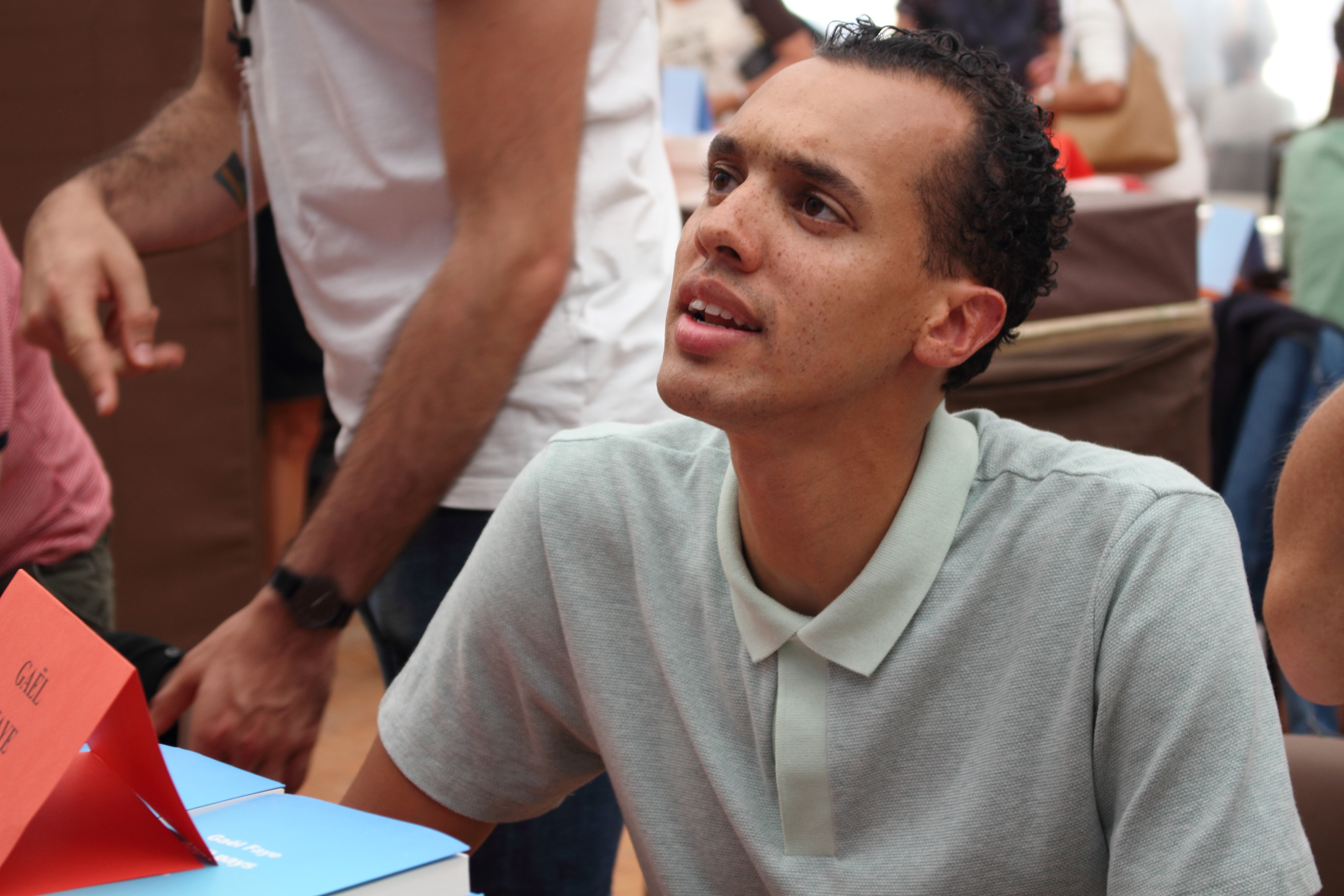
Gaël Faye, a Rwandan-French author and musician, at Le Livre sur la Place 2016 literary festival

Due to the Rwandan genocide, many ethnic Rwandans today live outside of the country of Rwanda. Many immigrants moved to nearby countries like Burundi, Kenya, and the Democratic Republic of Congo. Other immigrants moved to Francophone countries like France, Belgium, and Switzerland. Rémy Ngamije’s novel The Eternal Audience of One follows a Rwandan immigrant's life in Cape Town, South Africa. Clemantine Wamariya's book The Girl Who Smiled Beads centers on her experience as a child fleeing 1994 Rwanda with her teenage sister. The novel follows them as refugees across seven different countries.

Gaël Faye's Small Country tells the story of a mixed French-Rwandan family living in exile in Burundi from their mother's home country of Rwanda. The novel tells the story of the 1993 Burundian genocide.

== Notable Rwandan authors ==
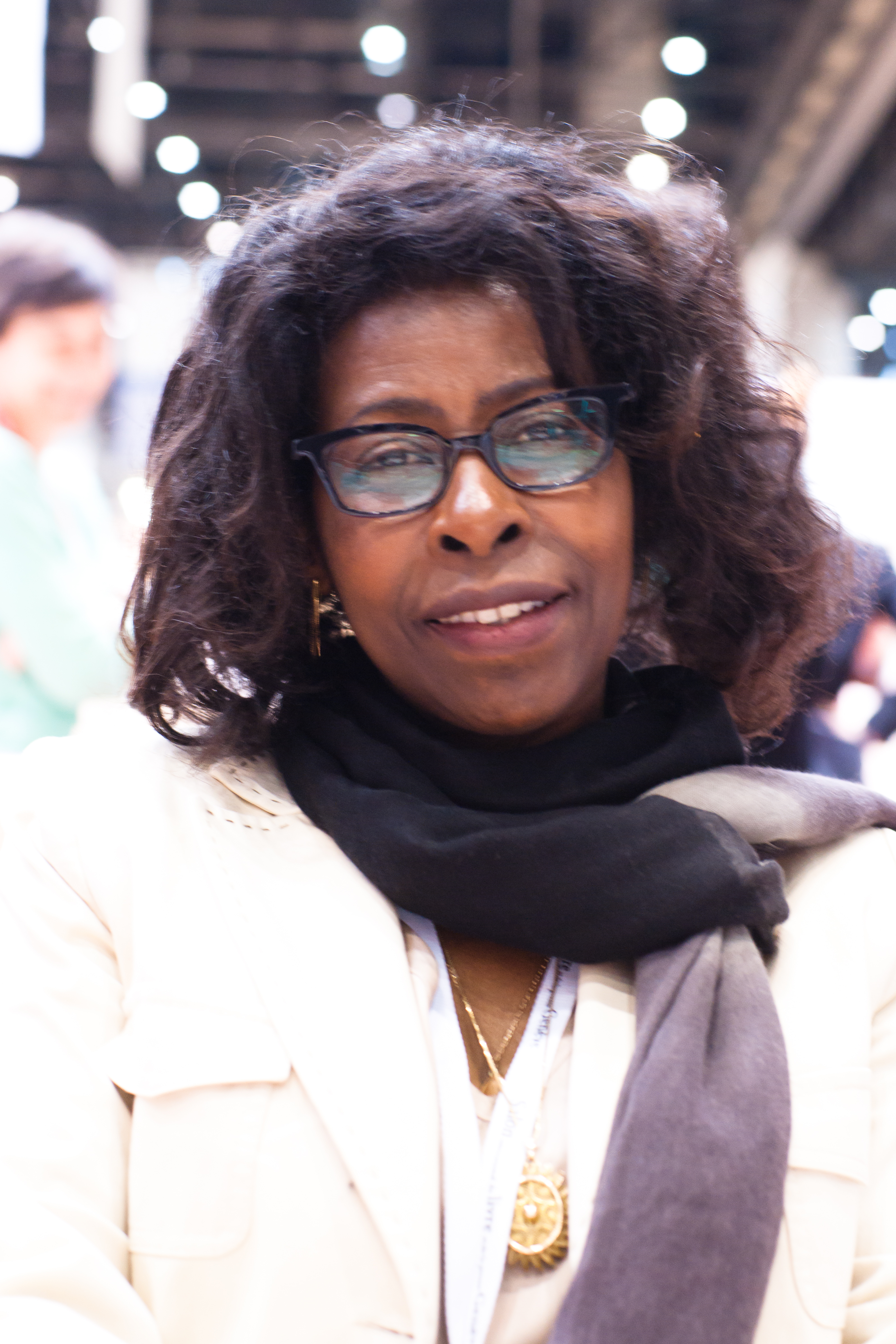
Scholastique Mukasonga, the author of Our Lady of the Nile

- Alexis Kagame
- Scholastique Mukasonga
- Saverio Naigiki
- Benjamin Sehene
- Clemantine Wamariya
- Eugénie Musayidire
- Yolande Mukagasana
- Immaculée Ilibagiza
- Gaël Faye

== Selected works ==
- Inganji Kalinga (Kalinga the Victorious) by Alexis Kagame, a mythical account of Rwanda's history
- L'Optimiste (The Optimist) by Saverio Naigiziki, about the marriage of a Hutu man and a Tutsi woman
- Le Feu sous la soutane (Fire under the Cassock) by Benjamin Sehene, about a Catholic priest's involvement in the Rwandan genocide
- Our Lady of the Nile by Scholastique Mukasonga, about the 1994 Rwandan genocide
- Kibogo by Scholastique Mukasonga, a satire of the clash between Rwandan religious beliefs and Christian missionaries
- Small Country by Gaël Faye, about Rwandans living in Bujumbura, Burundi during the 1993 Burundian genocide

== Rwandan publishing houses ==
- Huza Press, a Kigali-based publishing house
- Éditions Bakame, Rwanda's only Kinyarwanda-language children's publishing house

== See also ==
- Culture of Rwanda
- Music of Rwanda
- Genocide studies
