= Charlotte Casiraghi =

Eldest daughter of Princess Caroline of Monaco, author and brand ambassador

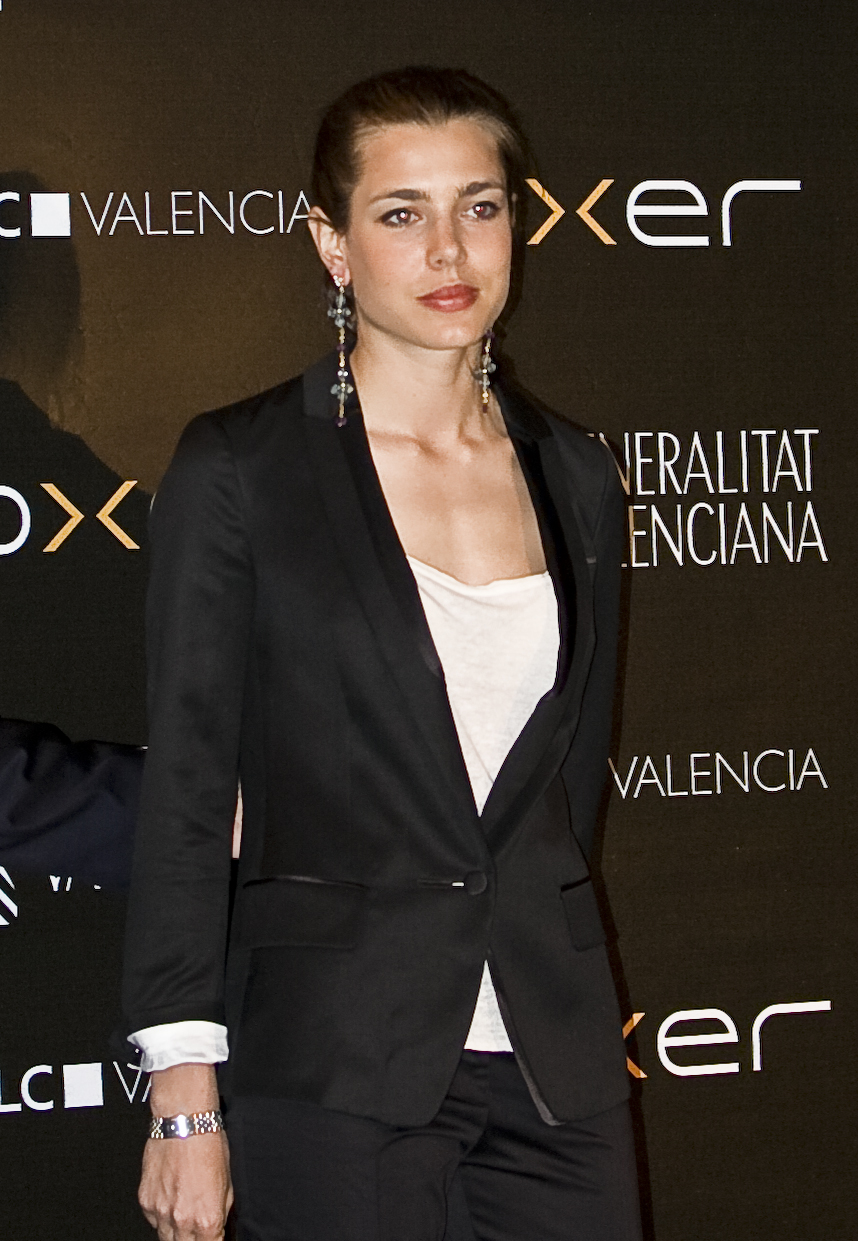
- Casiraghi in 2010
- Born: Charlotte Marie Pomeline Casiraghi; 3 August 1986 (age 40); Princess Grace Hospital Centre, La Colle, Monaco
- Education: Catholic University of Paris (B.A.)
- Occupations: Brand ambassador, Montblanc & Chanel; President, PhiloMonaco; Editor-in-Chief, Ever Manifesto & Ever Bamboo; President, GCT Longines-Monaco; Producer, Our Lady of the Nile (2020); Board member, FXB France
- Spouse: Dimitri Rassam (m. 2019; div. 2024)
- Partner: Gad Elmaleh (2011–2015)
- Children: 2
- Parent(s): Stefano Casiraghi; Princess Caroline of Monaco
- Relatives: Rainier III, Prince of Monaco (grandfather); Grace Kelly (grandmother)
- Writing career
- Language: French
- Genre: Essay
- Subjects: Philosophy, literature
- Works: La Fêlure (Julliard, 2026); Archipels des Passions (Le Seuil, 2018)
- Notable awards: Prix Mosanostra 2026
- Website: https://www.charlotte-casiraghi.com (official)

Charlotte Marie Pomeline Casiraghi (born 3 August 1986) is a Monégasque writer and philosopher with experiences working in journalism and publishing. She has worked extensively as a brand ambassador and fashion model. While for many years she pursued equestrianism, her main interests revolve around French philosophy and literature. She is the second child of Caroline, Princess of Hanover, and the late Stefano Casiraghi, an Italian industrialist. She is twelfth in line to the throne of Monaco. Her maternal grandparents were Rainier III, Prince of Monaco, and American actress Grace Kelly.

== Early life ==
Charlotte Casiraghi was born in Princess Grace Hospital Centre in La Colle, Monaco, on 3 August 1986 to Princess Caroline of Monaco and Stefano Casiraghi. She was christened on 20 September 1986. Her godparents are Albina du Boisrouvray and Stefano Casiraghi's brother-in-law, Massimo Bianchi. She has two brothers: Andrea (b. 1984) and Pierre (b. 1987). When she was four years old, her father was killed in a boating accident. After his death, Princess Caroline moved the family to the Midi village of Saint-Rémy-de-Provence in France, with the intention of minimizing their exposure to the press.

In January 1999, Charlotte gained a stepfather and two stepbrothers, (Prince Ernst of Hanover and Prince Christian of Hanover), when her mother married Ernst August, Prince of Hanover. Six months later, Casiraghi's half-sister, Princess Alexandra of Hanover, was born at a clinic in Vöcklabruck, Austria. Casiraghi is one of the godmothers to her sister. The family then moved north to the Seine et Marne region near Paris.

From 2001 through 2004, as a member of Marcel Rozier's Team Marionnaud, Casiraghi participated in a number of Junior and Amateur class show jumping competitions. She was trained by his son Thierry Rozier.

== Education ==
After her father's death and the family's move to Saint-Rémy-de-Provence, she entered the French public school system. Later, as her family moved north to Le Mée-sur-Seine, she attended the Lycée François-Couperin, in nearby Fontainebleau, where her philosophy teacher was Robert Maggiori, who was to play a major role in her life.

She obtained her baccalaureate exam in July 2004 with summa cum laude. She then enrolled in the hypokhâgne and khâgne course at the Lycée Fénelon, in St-Germain-des-Près, Paris, in the hope of entering the École normale supérieure (Paris). She took the written entrance exam for ENS in June 2006, but did not proceed to the oral exam.

In 2007, Casiraghi earned a Licence de Philosophie (B.A.) from the University of Paris IV: Paris-Sorbonne. She completed two internships, first with the publishing house of Éditions Robert Laffont in Paris, and then later from October 2007 with the Sunday magazine supplement of The Independent newspaper of London. In 2018, she told Clara Le Fort of Billionaire magazine: "I continued studying philosophy while at the Sciences Po Doctoral School." According to her official website, as well as an interview she sat for in 2023, Casiraghi furthered her studies for a master's degree at the Catholic University of Paris. She earned her master's degree in the class of 2024.

== Career ==
=== Fashion and modeling ===
In 2010, while still competing in equestrian sport, Casiraghi became the official ambassador for equestrian collections at Gucci. In 2014, she became the face of Gucci Cosmetics.

Casiraghi later modeled for Yves Saint Laurent's campaign for its Fall 2018 collection that ran under the hashtag #YSL15. She was photographed by David Sims and was the primary face of the campaign.

In 2018, Casiraghi collaborated with Montblanc, of which she had been global brand ambassador since 2015, on a line of jewelry called Les Aimants. The line, inspired by Nancy Cunard, was made in collaboration with Zaim Kamal, the creative director of the brand. Les Aimants was officially launched at the 2018 Cannes Film Festival.

Casiraghi modeled for photographer Collier Schorr in the eighth issue of System magazine. In a gender fluid framework, she modeled clothing from the Gucci menswear line. The campaign challenged notions of constructed gender identity and expressed Casiraghi's suitability for its message by saying that she exemplified the muse ("Gucci muse with a royal bloodline") whose heritage links her with archetypes associated with Hollywood and royalty.

On 22 December 2020, she became a brand ambassador of Chanel. She was the global face for Chanel's Spring/Summer 2021 campaign. The year 2022 saw her expand her brand ambassadorial role as she assumed a prominent role in promoting the Chanel Cruise 2022–23, unveiled at Les Baux de Provence and destined for Monaco. Noting that Casiraghi had been the star of the fashion house's Spring 2021 campaign, Bruno Pavlovsky, president of Chanel SAS, assured the press that Casiraghi "would continue to play an important role in the brand's communications." He highlighted her collaboration with designer Virginie Viard, who shared Casiraghi's intellectual and philosophical vision.

Casiraghi's most memorable moment as a Chanel brand ambassador was her appearance on the runway for the Spring/Summer 2022 Haute Couture Show at the Grand Palais Éphémère. She did not walk on the runway; she rode onto it on the back of a Spanish bay horse called Kuskus. By then, as she told a journalist two years later, she was somewhat out of practice on horseback, but she loved the novelty and the secrecy and surprise behind the stunt. The unusual entrance was accompanied by a short, equestrian-themed film featuring Casiraghi. The film was shot by contemporary artist Xavier Veilhan, The film, which was set to music by Sébastien Tellier, was shot in vintage quality film and highlighted the harmonies between horse and rider.

==== Les Rendez-vous littéraires rue Cambon ====
In 2021, when Viard was the director of design at Chanel, she invited Casiraghi to be the spokesperson and co-host for Les Rendez-vous littéraires rue Cambon, a cultural series in podcast and video form. The series expanded the fashion house's literary tradition which is rooted in its earliest days, since its founding by Gabrielle Chanel. Casiraghi was a key fixture on the panel that would discuss, usually in French, a particular female author and set of works. The episode on Virginia Woolf in 2021 was the first to be broadcast in English and away from Paris. (It was held at Somerset House in London.) Each literary rendezvous consisted of a panel with Casiraghi, literary scholar Fanny Arama, an actress who was a brand ambassador for Chanel, and a writer. Each panelist was a woman, a key feature in line with the project's goal of female emancipation. That episode and others that were conducted in English (like the American debut with Siri Hustvedt and Rachel Eliza Griffiths) added to the panel the writer Erica Wagner. The Rachel Cusk episode, the 13th overall, was also conducted in English, with Naomi Campbell joining the discussion on how pregnancy and maternity complicate the creative process for women.

=== Philosophy ===
In 2015, Casiraghi founded Les Rencontres Philosophiques de Monaco (In English: "Philosophical Encounters" or "Meetings"). The organization, of which she is president, is known for short as "PhiloMonaco." Her co-founders include her former teacher in Fontainebleau, the philosopher Robert Maggiori. The others original founders are Joseph Cohen and Raphael Zagury-Orly. Casiraghi's mother, Princess Caroline, is among the long list of honorary members of the organization, which is, in essence, a think tank for the discussion of contemporary issues, publishing on philosophical topics, engagement with the public in meaningful dialogue, educational programs for schoolchildren. Moreover, there is an annual prize for the recognition of outstanding writing on philosophical themes ("which has opened up new paths in the field of philosophy and introduced alternative approaches in science, politics, theology, history, anthropology, ethics or psychoanalysis.") Other well-known thinkers who are/were part of the organization as honorary members include philosopher Jean-Luc Marion, the late Umberto Eco, Boris Cyrulnik, and Albina du Boisrouvray, Casiraghi's godmother.

The writings and the life of Anne Dufourmantelle (another honorary member) made a strong impact on Casiraghi, who wrote about Dufourmantelle's book Défense du Secret for Libération and also wrote the preface for that book. Casiraghi and Dufourmantelle, who died in 2017, were friends, sharing, according to Casiraghi, a passion not only for philosophy but for horses.

Casiraghi wrote the preface for L'érotisme maternel et son sens aujourd'hui by psychoanalyst Julia Kristeva published in 2017. Kristeva is an honorary member of Les Rencontres Philosophiques de Monaco. In May 2016, the two women also published (in Air France Magazine) their letters to one another, reflecting on motherhood and womanhood, under the title: "Epistolary Encounters". Casiraghi also wrote "Souffrances inconnues", a chapter in Kristeva's work Révolte et reliance. This chapter was originally a lecture that Casiraghi delivered at the colloque de Cerisy in 2021.

In August 2026, it was announced that Casiraghi had been hired to be the director of a new collection for the Actes Sud publishing house in France. The collection, called Un pas de côté (step aside), will curate and publish philosophical works that explore ordinary concepts from new perspectives. The first title from the collection, La vérité sort de la bouche des enfants, by the French psychologist Laurence Joseph, would be released on 23 September.

=== Writings ===
==== Archipel des Passions ====
In March 2018, Casiraghi and Maggiori published their Kindle book, through Éditions du Seuil. The title is Archipel des Passions (Archipelago of the Passions). It is a series of dialogues between the professor and the student about the various passions (i.e. arrogance, joy, cruelty, love) and their affects. It is also "an essay on the passion of thought". Dedicated to her father and to Maggiori's brother, the book explores around forty passions. It is translated in Spanish, German, and Italian.

==== La Fêlure ====
In January 2026, Casiraghi's latest work, La Fêlure was published by Éditions Julliard, a philosophical and literary work. The book, written in her native French, explores the idea of the "crack-up" in literature, starting with The Crack-Up by F. Scott Fitzgerald.

The book has been called a "map" or "compass" of the literary landscape, tracing a kind of genealogy of the vulnerabilities that have shaped the writings of the great poets, songwriters, and philosophers.

The artwork for the cover of the book was designed by Eloïse van der Heyden, an illustrator and potter.

The book discusses several authors, philosophers, and artists in this context, in other words, in terms how they experienced and/or thought about emotional fracture and fragility: Ingeborg Bachmann, Gilles Deleuze, Louis-Ferdinand Céline, F. Scott Fitzgerald, Emil Cioran, Colette, Maya Angelou, Jean-Louis Chrétien, Honoré de Balzac, Maria Pourchet, Marguerite Duras, Natalia Ginzburg, Cesare Pavese, Paul Valéry, J.J. Cale, Anna Akhmatova, Roberto Juarroz, Bernard Moitessier, George Sand, Charles Baudelaire, Elizabeth von Arnim, Virginia Woolf, Sigmund Freud, Anne Dufourmantelle, Catherine Pozzi, Blaise Pascal, and Marguerite Périer.

The French-language unabridged audiobook was released on 26 March 2026. It is narrated by Julie Pouillon.

La Fêlure was shortlisted for the Fitzgerald Prize, an annual award from the jury of the Groupe Belles Rives and presented at the Hôtel Belles Rives, Scott and Zelda Fitzgerald's former home in Antibes.

On 21 August 2026, at the E Statinate festival in Corsica, the book won the Prix Mosanostra. This was Casiraghi's first literary award. The Prix Mosanostra is awarded annually to an author of a work in the Corsican or French language. For the year 2026, the Mayor of Lumio, Étienne Suzzoni, Marie-France Bereni-Canazzi, president of the Association Mosanostra, presented the winner with a statue from POPYNA Sculptures of Corsica. In accepting the award, Casiraghi said: “Thank you from the bottom of my heart. This is the first prize I have received for this book, and I think Corsica brings me luck.”

On 9 September 2026, it was announced that Casiraghi's book La fêlure had been selected among twelve other works for the first selection of the Prix Philippe Sollers and that, following one more selection round, the winner would be announced on 27 November at the Café Beaubourg in Paris.

=== Equestrianism ===
In June 2009, Casiraghi, accompanied by her uncle Albert II, Prince of Monaco, appeared on the French television programme Stade 2 to speak about her recent enrollment in the Global Champions Tour.

Since returning to the show jumping sport in April 2009 (after a four-year hiatus), she continued to train with Thierry Rozier. Casiraghi participated in the 2009 Global Champions Tour around Europe.

Casiraghi continued participation in the Global Champions Tour throughout 2010. As Gucci sponsored her competitions, she and her horses wore accessories from that fashion house. For the most part, she rode horses Troy (a chestnut stallion) and Tintero (a grey gelding). The GCT "Pro-Am Cup" (Professional-Amateur) relay was her original concept. For the Pro-Am Cup events, Casiraghi teamed with top-tier equestrian Edwina Alexander, who was also sponsored by Gucci.

In 2010, she assumed the role of honorary president of the Global Champions Tour (now the Longines Global Champions Tour) in Monaco; her mother had been honorary president of the event as it existed prior to its inclusion in the Global Champions Tour. After 2015, with her other projects, motherhood, and master's degree taking priority, Casiraghi reduced her participation to the Monaco and Paris phases of the Longines tour only. From about 2015, her participation has largely been representational and supportive (i.e. attending the high-star events and prize ceremonies.)

=== Journalism ===
Casiraghi is a published writer and magazine editor. Her credits include work for AnOther Magazine (its issue for January 2008) and the Sunday supplement to the British The Independent newspaper in the late months of 2007. She was the editor-at-large for Above magazine in 2009.

Through her work as the editor-at-large for Above magazine, Casiraghi befriended Stella McCartney, whom she interviewed for the magazine's first issue. McCartney enlightened Casiraghi and readers as to the many ways the fashion industry can harm the ecosystem. Also for Above, Casiraghi was reported in Women's Wear Daily as being "instrumental in securing an interview with Gomorrah author Roberto Saviano (which took place in hiding thanks to Saviano's dissection of the Mafia)."

On 21 September 2009, Casiraghi announced plans to publish 3,000 copies of Ever Manifesto, a free publication on what she considers the fashion industry's harmful impact on the global environment and to promote sustainability in fashion. Specifically, she said in 2013: "It's only recently that I've questioned the way that I've been consuming. I haven't been as conscious as I should have been."

The debut issue of Ever Manifesto was distributed free at the 10 Corso Como boutique during Milan Fashion Week and again at Colette in Paris during Paris Fashion Week. Casiraghi explained that the magazine will not have a predetermined publication schedule. "We want to publish when we have something to say or people to support," she said. "It will be short and meaningful so that people will read it."

In September 2009, the day after La Stampa published an interview of her about the manifesto, Casiraghi joined her partners on the project, Niedzielski and Guttman, at the gallery of Michelangelo Pistoletto, in Biella, Piedmont. Along with the artist and the Vogue Italia editor-in-chief Franca Sozzani, they unveiled plans for Ever Manifesto and the Città dell'arte Fashion: Bio Ethical Sustainable Trend.

In October 2009, Casiraghi was a guest at the Stella McCartney show in Paris. Sitting in the front row with Dasha Zhukova, Paul McCartney and Gwyneth Paltrow, she told Women's Wear Daily about Ever Manifesto. Copies of the magazine's first issue were left on the seats before the show. "We will announce [succeeding issues] on the website soon," she said.

Casiraghi did co-edit the second "manifesto" with Niedzielski and von Guttman. That issue is Ever Bamboo.

Casiraghi contributed to the October 2009 issue of 20, the free newspaper of Alex Dellal's gallery, 20 Hoxton Square Projects.

In March 2026, Casiraghi was a guest editor for one day at Vosges Matin, a daily newspaper in Épinal. This was during her book tour for La Fêlure (Julliard, 2026) and a round of engagements that included signings at local bookstores and libraries.

=== Film production ===
In 2012, Casiraghi founded Swoon Productions, which focused on equestrian films. However, in 2014, she bought the film rights to the book Notre-Dame du Nil (English translation:Our Lady of the Nile) by Scholastique Mukasonga. That book was adapted into feature film Our Lady of the Nile (2020), which was co-produced by Casiraghi and her former husband, Dimitri Rassam. Casiraghi explained (in an interview first printed in Madame Le Figaro) why she invested in this project; "When I read it, I immediately saw the cinematographic potential," she said, adding: "I saw characters carrying universal values, beings who want to conquer their freedom and go in search of their identity."

== Philanthropy and public life ==
Casiraghi is a private citizen, but occasionally attends official functions in Monaco, such as a fundraising gala for AMADE Mondiale and Nelson Mandela's foundation in September 2007. In 2006, she made her debut appearance at Monaco's Rose Ball (in French: Bal de la Rose), which also raises money for the Princess Grace Foundation.

Casiraghi is meticulous about protecting her image and privacy rights in France, even using the civil court system when necessary.

In 2015, she joined the governing committee of FXB France, a humanitarian organization founded by her godmother Albina du Boisrouvray in 1989 to combat AIDS and poverty. FXB is a global organization with headquarters in France, Switzerland, and the USA.

Casiraghi grew up with a complicated relationship with the media. In spite of being a private citizen, without an official public position or title in the Princely House of Grimaldi, she was often treated in the media as if she were a princess. At the age of 16, Casiraghi was named at number 10 on a list of the world's most eligible young women. Vanity Fair selected Casiraghi as one of the International Best Dressed List of 2006.

In an interview for the UK's Telegraph newspaper in September 2024, Casiraghi talked about her navigation of this fine line between official representation and private status, stressing that she preferred being on the fringe of the former, as it allows her "more complexity and diversity" of expression.

When she was still a child, her grandfather Rainier III, Prince of Monaco designated her to be patron of the Public Safety Division in Monaco, a representational role that continues in the current reign of her uncle, Prince Albert II.

In 2024, she was appointed as a Knight of the Order of Cultural Merit ( Monaco) as a recognition of her contributions to the cultural life of the Principality.

== Personal life ==
In December 2011, Casiraghi started dating stand-up comedian and actor Gad Elmaleh. Their son, Raphaël, was born on 17 December 2013. As Raphaël's parents were not married, he is not included in the line of succession to the Monegasque throne. The couple split in June 2015.

In March 2018, several credible media sources reported Casiraghi's engagement to film producer Dimitri Rassam, the son of French actress Carole Bouquet, and it was widely noted that she wore a diamond ring at Monaco's Rose Ball on 24 March. She was visibly pregnant by the summer and the couple chose to postpone a wedding until after the birth of their child. On 23 October 2018, she gave birth to a second child, a son named Balthazar. The couple married civilly at the Prince's Palace of Monaco on 1 June 2019. They celebrated in a reception at the nearby Villa La Vigie in Roquebrune Cap Martin. On 29 June 2019, they married religiously at the Abbey of Sainte-Marie de Pierredon, Mouriès, near Saint-Rémy-de-Provence. In early 2024, it was reported that the couple had separated and divorced later that year.

In March 2024, an article in Paris Match suggested a romance between Casiraghi and the Prix Goncourt laureate Nicolas Mathieu with further speculation appearing in Libération. Two years on, the relationship gained another round of widespread media speculation as they appeared together in a box at the Rolex Monte-Carlo Masters. The photos from that appearance were used for another cover story in Paris Match. (Note: Issue 16 for the year, publication date: 9 June 2026.)

== Publications ==
=== Books ===
- La Fêlure. By Charlotte Casiraghi. Published by Éditions Julliard, 29 January 2026. ISBN 978-2260057413
- Archipel des Passions (H.C. ESSAIS). By Charlotte Casiraghi and Robert Maggiori. Published by Éditions du Seuil, 1 March 2018. ISBN 978-2-0213-3575-3

=== Translations of her works ===
- Casiraghi, Charlotte, and Robert Maggiori. Archipiélago de pasiones. Spanish edition of Archipel des Passions. Translated by Estela Consigli, Libros del Zorzal, 2019.
- Casiraghi, Charlotte, and Robert Maggiori. Arcipelago delle passioni. Italian edition of Archipel des Passions. Translated by Sergio Arecco. La nave di Teseo, 2019. ISBN 9788893449298.
- Casiraghi, Charlotte, and Robert Maggiori. Archipel der Leidenschaften: Kleine Philosophie der großen Gefühle. German edition of Archipel des Passions. Translated into German by Grit Fröhlich et al. C.H. Beck, 2019. Published on 15 October 2019.
- Casiraghi, Charlotte. La crepa. Italian edition of La Fêlure. Translated by Cettina Caliò. La Nave di Teseo, 6 October 2026. ISBN 9788834624326.

=== Essays/chapters ===
- Casiraghi, Charlotte and Julia Kristeva. Epistolary Encounters. Air France Magazine. May 2016. Part of a workshop series for Les Rencontres Philosophiques de Monaco.
- Casiraghi, Charlotte. "Les Livres de ma vie". Lire magazine. Iss. 496 (May 2021): 130.
- Casiraghi, Charlotte. "Souffrances inconnues." Chapter in Julia Kristeva: Révolte et reliance, pp. 475–485. Edited by Sarah-Anaïs Crevier Goulet et al., Hermann, 2024. ISBN 9791037022820.
- Casiraghi, Charlotte and Boris Cyrulnik. Infancia y violencia (Spanish edition). Casiraghi wrote the prologue. Published on 30 September 2025 by Libros del Zorzal. ISBN 9791387996093. This is a Spanish edition of Enfance et violence (French edition) published by Les Rencontres Philosophiques de Monaco in 2018.
- Casiraghi, Casiraghi. "Je voyage avec trop de livres. Ma valise et toujours en surpoids." EnVois magazine (formerly Air France Magazine). June/July 2026, p. 132.

=== Editorial collections ===
- Director, Un pas de côté, Actes Sud
  - La vérité sort de la bouche des enfants by Laurence Joseph

=== Prefaces, forewords ===
- Casiraghi, Charlotte. Preface. Edwina Tops-Alexander: The Winner of Oz, by Edwina Tops-Alexander, Lavauzelle, 2012. ISBN 9782702515549.
- Casiraghi, Charlotte. Préface. Défense du secret, by Anne Dufourmantelle, Payot & Rivages, 2019. ISBN 9782743646127.
- Casiraghi, Charlotte. Préface. La Femme et le Sacrifice: D'Antigone à la femme d'à côté, by Anne Dufourmantelle, Éditions Denoël, 2018. ISBN 9782207181423.
- Casiraghi, Charlotte. Préface. L'érotisme maternel et son sens aujourd'hui, by Julia Kristeva, Les Rencontres Philosophiques de Monaco, 2017.
- Casiraghi, Charlotte. Préface. Moi aussi je pense donc je suis: Quand les femmes réinventent la philosophie, by Élodie Pinel, Éditions Stock, 2024. ISBN 9782234096608. Republished by Groupe Flammarion on 13 May 2026 with Casiraghi's preface. ISBN 9782080459176.

=== Periodicals ===
- Les Cahiers des Rencontres Philosophiques de Monaco. Role: Editor-in-Chief (in French, Rédactrice en chef) with Laura Hugo (2015–Present.)
  - Charlotte Casiraghi, Le Cahier 3, Les Rencontres Philosophiques de Monaco, 2018, p. 3
- Everlution. Ever Manifesto. First Issue. October 2009. Role: Editor-in-chief with Alexia Niedzielski and Elizabeth von Guttman.
- Ever Bamboo. Ever Manifesto. Second Issue. June 2011. Role: Editor-in-chief with Alexia Niedzielski and Elizabeth von Guttman.

== Awards and distinctions ==
- Knight of the Order of Cultural Merit in Monaco, 18 November 2024
- Prix Musanostra, in Lumio, Corsica, for the book La Fêlure, 21 August 2026

== See also ==
- Ever Manifesto
- Global Champions Tour
- Princely Family of Monaco
- Les Rencontres Philosophiques de Monaco
- Association François-Xavier Bagnoud

== Notes ==
Lines of succession
Preceded by Bianca Casiraghi	Succession to the Monegasque throne 12th in line	Succeeded by Balthazar Rassam
