= Our Lady of the Nile (film) =

- French: Notre-Dame du Nil
- Directed by: Atiq Rahimi
- Written by: Atiq Rahimi; Ramata-Toulaye Sy
- Based on: Our Lady of the Nile (Notre-Dame du Nil) by Scholastique Mukasonga
- Produced by: Charlotte Casiraghi; Marie Legrand; Rani Massalha; Dimitri Rassam
- Starring: Amanda Mugabezaki; Albina Kirenga; Malaika Uwamahoro
- Cinematography: Thierry Arbogast
- Edited by: Hervé de Luze
- Production companies: Les Films du Tambour; Chapter 2 France 2 Cinéma; Swoon Productions; Belga Productions
- Release dates: 5 September 2019 (TIFF); 5 February 2020
- Running time: 93 minutes
- Countries: France; Belgium; Rwanda; Monaco
- Languages: French, Kinyarwanda

Our Lady of the Nile is a 2019 French-language film directed and co-written by Atiq Rahimi. An adaptation of the 2012 novel Our Lady of the Nile by Rwandan writer Scholastique Mukasonga, the film is set in Rwanda in 1994, amid the beginning of the tensions between the Hutu and Tutsi peoples that would eventually culminate in the genocide against the Tutsi.

== Plot ==
The film is set in Rwanda in the early 1990s at an elite Catholic girls’ boarding school, Our Lady of the Nile, located near the source of the Nile. The school brings together students from both Hutu and Tutsi backgrounds under the supervision of European clergy and teachers. Although the institution promotes discipline and religious values, ethnic divisions persist. Tutsi students face informal quotas and discrimination, while Hutu students are encouraged to assert ethnic identity. As political tensions intensify across the country, hostility within the school escalates. Influenced by propaganda and social pressures, some students engage in acts of exclusion and violence against their Tutsi classmates. The breakdown of order within the school ultimately mirrors the wider collapse of coexistence in Rwandan society, foreshadowing the genocide against the Tutsi.

== Cast ==
- Clariella Bizimana as Veronica
- Amanda Santa Mugabekazi as Virginia
- Pascal Greggory as Monsieur Fontenaille
- Albina Kirenga as Gloriosa
- Belinda Rubango as Modesta
- Malaika Uwamahoro (credited as Angel Uwamahoro) as Immaculée

== Awards ==
2020 Berlin International Film Festival, Winner: Crystal Bear (Generation 14plus) Best Film.

== Festivals ==
- 2019 Toronto Film Festival (where it premiered)
- 2019. Antalya Golden Orange Film Festival
- 2020, Giffoni Film Festival
- 2020, Cinemania
- 2020 Africa in Motion
- 2020, São Paulo International Film Festival
- 2020, Fribourg International Film Festival
- 2020, Seville European Film Festival
- 2020, Palm Springs International Film Festival
- 2020, Haifa International Film Festival
- 2020, Luxor African Film Festival
- 2021, Adelaide Film Festival
- 2021, New York African Film Festival
- Darwin Film Festival
- Marrakech International Film Festival
