= Kibogo (novel) =

2020 novel by Scholastique Mukasonga

- Author: Scholastique Mukasonga
- Original title: Kibogo est monté au ciel
- Translator: Mark Polizzotti
- Language: French
- Publication date: March 12, 2020
- ISBN: 9798212025683

Kibogo (French: Kibogo est monté au ciel) is a novel by Scholastique Mukasonga first published in 2020. The novel is told in four short, intertwined stories about the interaction between local beliefs and European Christianity in 1940s colonial Rwanda. It was translated into English by Mark Polizzotti in 2022, published by Archipelago Books in the United States and Daunt Books in the United Kingdom.

== Language ==
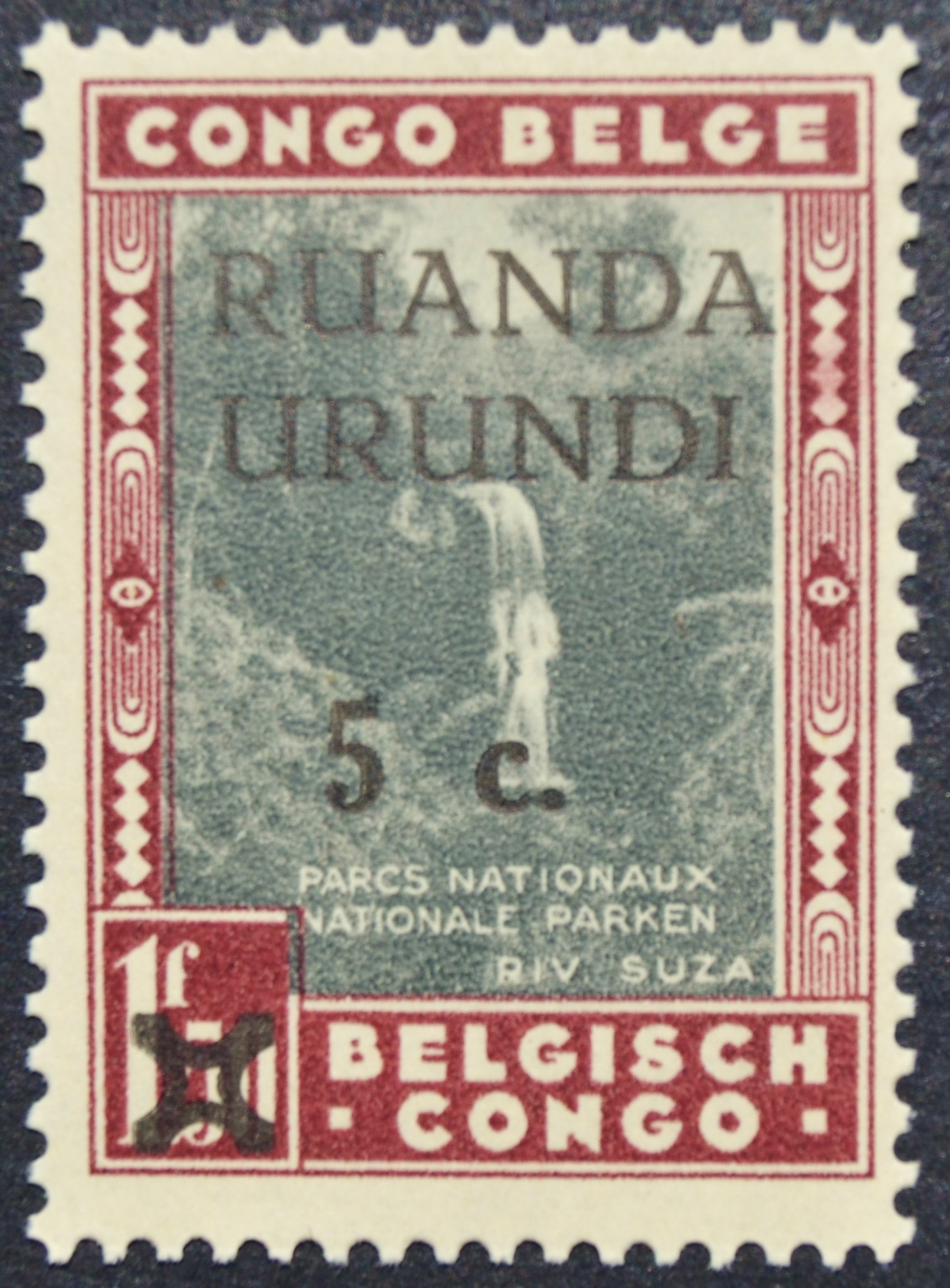
Stamp from Ruanda-Urundi, 1941

The novel was originally written in French, although Kinyarwanda words are used extensively throughout the book. Mark Polizotti, the French to English translator, left in the Kinyarwanda words in his version.

Some reviews have said that a glossary of Kinyarwanda terms would have been helpful, since not all the meanings can be inferred from context.

== Historical context ==
The setting of the novel is the historical region of Ruanda-Urundi, then a colonial territory controlled by Belgium. The great famine of 1943-1944, the central conflict of Kibogo, was greatly worsened by the Belgian colonizers. They used manpower towards weapon production for World War II, contributing to the effects of the drought.

== Principal characters ==
Kibogo, the mythical figure who is believed to have disappeared into the clouds on the fictional Mount Runani. The Rwandans believe he will bring back the rain.

Mukamwezi, also called Mrs. Kibogo, is the pagan priestess who was married to Kibogo as a virgin bride. She lives in isolation on the mountainside.

Akayezu, a Rwandan boy chosen to attend seminary school and who tries to spread Christianity throughout Rwanda. He mysteriously resurrects Angelina's still born baby. Eventually, he comes to believe the Bible tells the story of the Rwandans.

== Plot ==
=== Ruzagayura ===
This chapter describes the event of the "ruzagayura," a great famine, as the native Rwandans struggle with opposing solutions from the Christian missionaries and their pagan beliefs. The village priest explains they must climb the forbidden mountain, renounce their traditional religion, and the Virgin Mary will restore the rains. However, the pagan priestess Mukamwezi says that the spirit of Kibogo spoke to her and instructed them to climb the mountain, where he will return the rain.

Five men and Mukamwezi ascend the mountain. At the summit, she calls out to the rains and winds to return to Rwanda, and briefly transforms into a lion with the face of a human. Eventually, the drought ends, and the rains return. The father gives a sermon at the church, where he thanks the Virgin Mary for her rains, and denounces anyone who may have used pagan rituals on the mountain. He announces that the king of Rwanda has converted and adopted a Christian name.

=== Akayezu ===
Akayezu, literally "little Jesus," is a boy from the hillside who was chosen to attend seminary school to study the Bible. Akayezu endeavored to evangelize the people of his hometown. He would preach every Sunday, to the disapproval of the Fathers, since he had not yet graduated and was taking away attendance from the church's Sunday mass. The Rwandans had many questions for him about life amongst the white people, such as what food he would eat and what would happen if there is another drought. So as to not offend the elders, Akayezu tells them Kibogo could arrive again to save them as needed. This enrages the Christian missionaries.

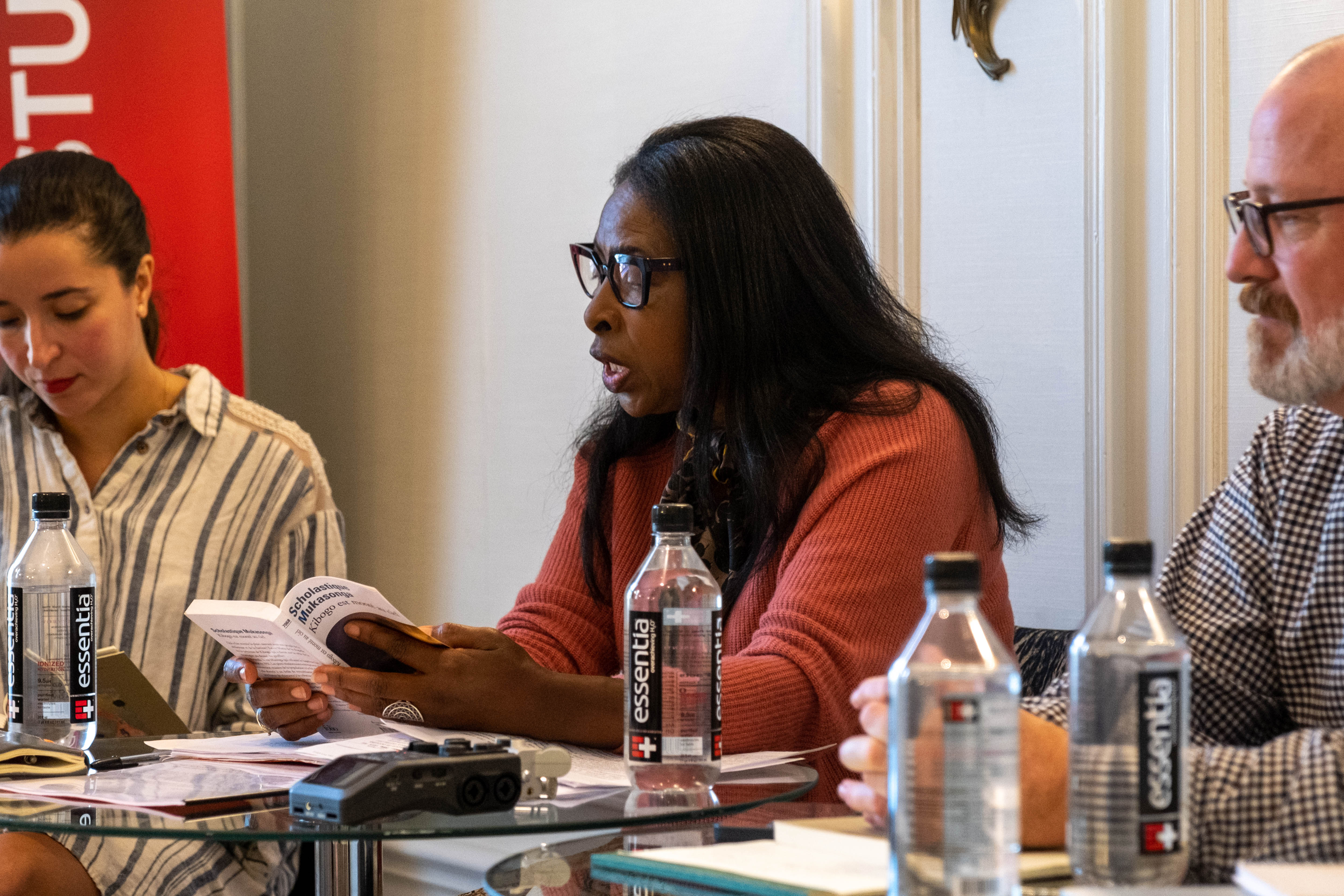
Scholastique Mukasonga reading Kibogo at a panel

One day, Akayezu is woken up to baptize a stillborn baby girl, Angelina, who ends up alive after his baptism. Angelina's resurrection further enrages the missionaries, and he is expelled from the seminary school. Akayezu goes to live in a hut in the woods, where his loyal followers, mainly women, continue visiting him for advice and blessings. Here, Akayezu eventually comes to the conclusion that the Bible really tells the story of the Rwandans, not the white men, and draws comparisons between Kibogo and Jesus Christ.

=== Mukamwezi ===
One day, Akayezu decided to baptize Mukamwezi. Eventually, she lets him in her hut, and they remain inside for one month. Akayezu's female followers are distraught, fearing that she has possessed him. They decide to save Akayezu from Mukamwezi's influence through various pagan methods, but their attempts fail. Later, some women are tending to Akayezu's hut. They leave an offering of sorghum beer, customary for the deceased. In the hut, they think they see a ghost, but are shocked to find Akayezu.

Akayezu reveals he has joined his spirit with Mukamwezi in a blood pact. A violent storm comes later that year and completely burns down the hut. No bodies for Akayezu or Mukamwezi are found, and the Rwandans eventually dismiss this tale. Some children decide one day to travel to the top of the hill out of curiosity. At the summit, surrounded in fog, they find an old Mukamwezi, who tells them on the day of the first storm, Akayezu ascended to heaven here. She tells them to tell everyone on the hillside that Akayezu will guide Kibogo to return and become the new ruler of Rwanda.

=== Kibogo ===
This chapter tells the story of a European professor and his assistants who come to the hillside to interview the elders about the story of Kibogo. The group scours the mountaintop for artifacts and they find human bones. Back in the hillside, the professor announces his departure. He claims that his work will revolutionize the field of African studies. Some of his future plans include a recreation of Kibogo's hut as a tourist attraction, as well as school to train the youths. Some time later, at church, one of the Fathers announces they must pray for the professor and his assistants, who died in a plane crash out of Rwanda. The story ends with the question of who, Jesus or Kibogo, truly caused this disaster.

== Reception ==
The book was reviewed in Publishers Weekly, which called it an "intriguing theological satire." A review in the Wall Street Journal praised Mukasonga's use of satire and dry humor. In The Guardian, Aminatta Forna described the novel as a "delightful and provocative miniature masterpiece", noting how the novel drew on traditions of oral storytelling.

Susi Wyss of the Washington Independent Review of Books said about Kibogo:

While this style of layering multiple versions of the same narrative — leaving the reader to guess what actually happened — may be too figurative and ambiguous for some Western readers, it does successfully evoke an intimate tone. Throughout Kibogo, the reader has a sense of sitting fireside and listening to an array of animated performers.

== Awards and Honors ==
- Finalist for National Book Award for Translated Literature in 2022
