= Cockroaches (memoir) =

2006 memoir by Scholastique Mukasonga

- Author: Scholastique Mukasonga
- Original title: Inyenzi ou les Cafards
- Translator: Jordan Stump
- Language: French
- Genre: Memoir
- Publisher: Éditions Gallimard
- Publication date: 2006

Cockroaches (French: Inyenzi ou les Cafards) is a 2006 memoir by Scholastique Mukasonga, published by Éditions Gallimard. It was published in English in 2016 by Archipelago Books, with the translation by Jordan Stump. It discusses the author's personal experiences with the Hutu-Tutsi conflict, which culminated in the 1994 Rwandan genocide.

Mukasonga referred to it as a "paper grave" to reflect how she escaped the situation and in memorial for her deceased relatives. The term "cockroaches" was an insult used against Tutsis in Rwanda.

== Contents ==
The initial chapters discuss life after her family, Tutsis, was removed from their hometown in pogroms which began to be held in 1959; the first chapter discusses the pogroms. The book also discusses her high school period at Lycée Notre-Dame-de-Citeaux, in which she was mistreated for being a Tutsi. Mukasonga went to France in 1986 and was unable to assist her family members who perished in the genocide. When the author came back to Rwanda, she found that her family's former residence was cleared away. She recalls the names of the deceased in a notebook she is writing on while visiting Gitagata and Gitwe, which were reduced to ruins. The book ends with a description of a snake she finds that she uses to symbolise the endurance of what the génocidaires tried to destroy. She lists names of deceased friends and acquaintances in the final paragraph as a memorial.

Nicole Lamy of The New York Times wrote that the book is a "haunting, urgent personal history of the Rwandan genocide".

== Writing style ==
Barbara Hoffert of Library Journal stated that the book "is related with brave, sobering, steely-eyed calm."

Russell West-Pavlov of the University of Tübingen stated that the imagery of the cockroach makes "eponymous image of" Cockroaches.

Julian Lucas of the New York Review of Books stated that a section describing the creation of urwagwa (a banana-based beer), an ordinary pastime for Rwandans, was the "most lyrical passage" in the book.

== Reception ==
Publishers Weekly stated that it is a "powerful and poignant book [that] plants itself in that terrible absence, its stone etched with a difficult, necessary grief."

Lamy stated that the book "will deeply shade your map."

Trish Crapo in The Women's Review of Books wrote: "In the end, Cockroaches is an important book because of the human face it puts on what might otherwise remain unimaginable suffering."
