= Our Lady of the Nile =

2012 French-language novel by Scholastique Mukasonga

- First French edition
- Author: Scholastique Mukasonga
- Original title: Notre-Dame du Nil
- Translator: Melanie Mauthner
- Language: French
- Publisher: Éditions Gallimard
- Publication date: 2012
- English publication date: 2014
- ISBN: 978-2-070-13342-0

Our Lady of the Nile (French: Notre-Dame du Nil) is a French-language novel by Rwanda-born writer Scholastique Mukasonga, originally published in 2012 by Éditions Gallimard. It is Mukasonga's fourth book and first novel. The English-language translation, published in the United States in 2014 by Archipelago Books, was done by Melanie Mauthner, a poet and writer from the United Kingdom.

The story is about life at a Catholic boarding secondary school in Nyambinombe District, Rwanda, circa 1980, prior to the Rwandan genocide of 1994.

Christine Rousseau of Le Monde wrote that "With bitter and tense writing, Our Lady of the Nile depicts a society walking inexorably towards horror." Brian P. Kelly of The New Criterion wrote that the book "is a snapshot of the social and racial conflicts that eventually led to the 1994 massacres." Madeleine LaRue of Music & Literature wrote that "The West has indeed too often dismissed suffering in Africa, but books like Our Lady of the Nile remind us why we must not be dismissive, why we must not look away."

In 2022, the novel was included on the "Big Jubilee Read" list of 70 books by Commonwealth authors, selected to celebrate the Platinum Jubilee of Elizabeth II.

== Synopsis ==
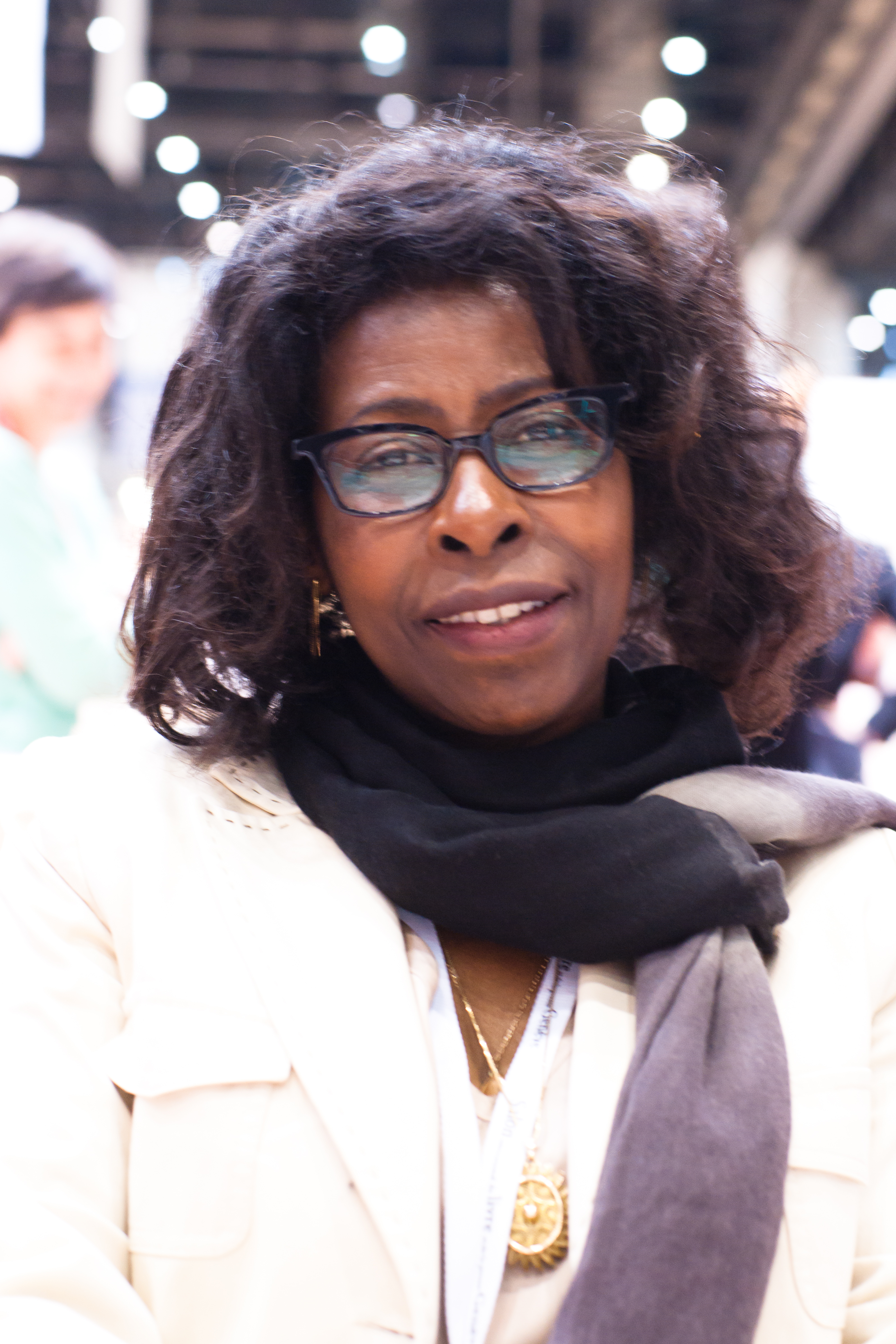
Scholastique Mukasonga, the author of the book

The story takes place at an all-girls lycée at the top of a hill, near the source of the Nile River. Most of the students are children of prominent government officials or wealthy businessmen. The story is set during Hutu rule, and the school has a quota that limits Tutsi students to 10% of the student body (two students per class year). Each chapter focuses on a particular event or series of events in and around the school, following the perspectives of several different students in their final year of high school.

These students and their stories include:

- Veronica (Tumurinde) - One of the only two Tutsi girls in her year, along with Virginia. They face danger from increased anti-Tutsi sentiment. Veronica has always loved the movies, and humors Monsieur de Fontenaille in his claims that Tutsis are descendants of pharaohs, and she is the goddess Isis, because dressing up and posing makes her feel like a movie star. Upon the outbreak of anti-Tutsi violence encouraged by Gloriosa, Veronica hides at Fontenaille's place but is found. She is raped and burned to death by a mob organized by Gloriosa.
- Virginia (Mutamuriza) - Virginia is also invited to Fontenaille's place, but is uninterested in being a "queen Candace" in his Tutsi pharaonic fantasy. However, her dreams are haunted by the ghost of the Rwandan queen buried on his property. She visits a shaman, who instructs her in laying the spirit of the queen to rest, and the queen offers guidance to Virginia in a dream. This guidance leads Virginia to trust Immaculée's offer of help when violence breaks out, saving her life. After all this, Virginia decides to leave the country for Burundi.
  - LaRue described Virginia and Veronica as the "true protagonists" of the story. Mukasonga herself had been forced to leave her school in the 1970s. LaRue wrote that "In this respect, Virginia is something of Mukasonga’s alter ego".
- Gloriosa (Nyiramasuka) - Gloriosa has influence from her powerful father, a Hutu and a prominent official in the Rwandan government. She often threatens the Tutsi students at the school. Near the end of the novel, Gloriosa lies about being attacked by Tutsis, and takes power in the school to "protect" it from future attacks. Gloriosa destroys the statue that the school is named after, since it has Tutsi features, and blames it on the imaginary Tutsi attackers. She begins a programme of racial persecution and invites soldiers to the school, who participate in killings, beatings, and rapes. After a coup, Gloriosa's father loses power and goes to prison, and Gloriosa's campaign of violence ends.
  - Byrd stated that she is a "two-dimensional demagogue", and he describes her as the "de facto villain." LaRue wrote: "If as a character she seems less complex, less interesting than her fellow students, this is likely intentional."
- Goretti - Goretti's father is a military official in charge of a base in Ruhengeri. Goretti is upset that white researchers act like they own and discovered Rwanda's gorillas, ignoring Rwandans. This prompts Goretti to organize her own visit to the gorilla reserve, which Immaculée joins. As Gloriosa's father loses power in a coup, Goretti's father gains it (possibly in a reference to the overthrow of Grégoire Kayibanda by Juvénal Habyarimana), and she gains Gloriosa's previous high social position.
- Frida - Frida's father works for the Rwandan Embassy in Zaire. Frida is courted by the Zairian Ambassador to Rwanda, who scandalously visits her at the school. The Ambassador insists that he plans to marry Frida, but when Frida becomes pregnant, she becomes sick and dies under mysterious circumstances.
- Godelive - Belgian Queen Fabiola to the school; amid the accompanying hubbub, Belgian-born Godelive is invited to accompany the Rwandan president's young daughter to Belgium. The president plans to give his daughter to the childless Belgian king and queen, a Rwandan custom showing closeness between families. The Belgian royals refuse the offer in confusion, and Godelive is transferred to an elite Belgian school as a consolation.
- Modesta - A half-Hutu, half-Tutsi girl, she sticks close by Gloriosa, acting as her "best friend," out of knowledge that her privilege as a Hutu is tenuous and things would go badly for her without Gloriosa's good will. Because of this, she corroborates Gloriosa's story of Tutsi attacks, and helps her destroy the Virgin Mary's statue. Though she can't be seen talking with her, she is otherwise close with Virginia.
- Immaculée (Mukagatare) - The most fashionable student in the class. Immaculée has a boyfriend with a motorbike. She visits a rainmaker for a spell to keep him from cheating on her. She accompanies Goretti on her visit to the gorillas, and saves Virginia from Gloriosa's violent Hutu-extremist mob by hiding her in the rainmaker's home. She decides to breaks up with her boyfriend after learning he has participated in the violence, realizing that she was mostly interested in his motorbike anyway. She is irritated by people attempting to force things upon her, and rebelling against such forces motivates her. At the end of the novel, she decides to become an assistant to the white gorilla researcher.

Other characters:

- Mother Superior - The head of the school. She goes along with Gloriosa's takeover out of fear of reprisals from her powerful father.
- Father Herménégilde - A chaplain who is the head of Catholic Relief Services. He supports Gloriosa's anti-Tutsi stances and commits himself to the Hutu cause. Herménégilde is sexually interested in his teenage students. He forces students (usually the more-vulnerable Tutsi students) to undress in front of him, giving them "gifts" of clothing as a pretext. He assists Gloriosa when she has the school raided.
- Olivier Lapointe - A hippie teacher from France, whose long hair enchants the students.
- Sister Lydwine - The school's geography teacher and the only Rwandan on the teaching staff.
- Monsieur de Fontenaille - A white artist, described by Lucas as having "failed" and being a "colonial holdover", Fontenaille lives by himself on a former coffee plantation. He believes Tutsi people were descendants of pharaohs. He takes an interest in Veronica, and he enjoys making sketches of the students. Fontenaille tells Veronica that he will help her get a European education. While Gloriosa has the school raided, Veronica is at Fontenaille's residence. He kills himself with a noose before the mob appears.
  - Lucas states that Fontenaille has "a morbid enchantment" with the possible complete disappearance of Tutsis even as he has "seeming concern" for Veronica's welfare.

== Style ==
Christopher Byrd of Barnes & Noble Review stated that the novel uses a context leading up to the Rwandan massacre while also maintaining "a universal texture to the resentment, envy, and opportunism that are a part of any student body." Nick DiMartino wrote in Three Percent that Mukasonga included "chuckling good humor" and was "playful" in her writing. The novel uses many Kinyarwanda words, a feature retained in the English translation; LaRue stated that many writers in post-colonial countries intersperse words of indigenous languages into texts written in European languages, which is "interrupting" the colonial language. The English version also retains usage of some French words, such as lycée, adding what LaRue describes as "another layer of 'foreignness' to the text".

Tom Zoellner of Chapman University argued that the beginning of the novel is "too preoccupied with stage-setting".

The reviewer for Publishers Weekly wrote that the characters are distinct and that a few characters "lack overt motivation for their nastiness", and LaRue argued that some characters are "too schematic".

== Reception ==
The book won the 2012 Prix Ahmadou-Kourouma. It also won the Prix Renaudot, the French Voices Award, and the Océans France Ô prize. Judith Rosen of Publishers Weekly ranked it as one of "The Big Indie Books of Fall 2014." In 2016, the English translation was on the shortlist for the International Dublin Literary Award.

Publishers Weekly wrote that Mukasonga "fully draws readers into the tensions, spirituality, and culture of Rwandan life from page one."

Byrd stated that the novel has an "air of foreboding consequence that imparts urgency to almost every page," and that "Mukasonga is a gifted storyteller with a sure sense of plot construction, and an aptitude for crafting piquant descriptions." However, Byrd also criticised the novel for the use of character archetypes, and for dialogue that "skews too much to blatant declarations."

Rousseau wrote that the book was "poignant and harsh."

Tom Zoellner of Chapman University stated that the book is an "outstanding work of African fiction," and that "Mukasonga is dead on target." Like Byrd, Zoellner felt that "Mukasonga’s strength is generally not in dialogue," as characters sometimes spoke in "stentorian proclamations that no self-respecting adolescent girl would attempt."

LaRue stated that "we should [...] welcome the opportunity to read Mukasonga’s work in English," despite its minor flaws (again, citing "occasionally clumsy" dialogue, as well as exposition).

John Taylor wrote in The Arts Fuse that Our Lady of the Nile is "well-constructed."

== Adaptations ==
In 2014, Charlotte Casiraghi bought the film rights to the book and became one of the producers of the novel's film adaptation. "Chapter 2," the production company run by Casiraghi's ex-husband Dimitri Rassam, released the film Our Lady of the Nile in partnership with Les Films du Tambour, run by Marie Legrand and Rani Massalha.

The film was directed by Atiq Rahimi and stars Amanda Santa Mugabekazi, Albina Sydney Kirenga, Malaika Uwamahoro, Clariella Bizimana, Belinda Rubango Simbi, and Pascal Greggory. Its world premiere was on 5 September 2019 at the Toronto International Film Festival, where the film was designated "Contemporary World Cinema Opening Film." It was released in the United States on 3 May 2022.

== See also ==
- Rwandan literature
- School story
