= The Barefoot Woman =

2008 memoir by Scholastique Mukasonga

- Author: Scholastique Mukasonga
- Language: French
- Genre: Memoir
- Publisher: Éditions Gallimard
- Publication date: 2008

The Barefoot Woman (French: La femme aux pieds nus) is a 2008 memoir by Scholastique Mukasonga, published by Éditions Gallimard. An English translation by Jordan Stump was published in 2018 by Penguin Random House.

The book concerns Mukasonga's mother. It has some discussion of the Rwandan genocide.

Parul Sehgul of The New York Times wrote that in comparison to Cockroaches, The Barefoot Woman is "gentler, in some ways" and that its "gaze [...] is softer".

== Contents ==
The book lists Mukasonga's memories based on various topics.

== Reception ==
In a review for The New York Times, Parul Sehgal stated that The Barefoot Woman "powerfully continues the tradition of women’s work it so lovingly recounts."

Publishers Weekly described it as "beautiful and elegiac", and strongly recommended the book as it gave it a star.

The English translation of Mukasonga's memoir by Jordan Stump was a finalist for the 2019 National Book Award for Translated Literature.
