= Above (magazine) =

American environmental magazine

- Editor-in-Chief: Nicolas Rachline
- Categories: Environmentalism
- Frequency: Bi-Annual
- Publisher: Centoria, Inc.
- First issue: June 2009
- Final issue: 2010
- Company: Centoria, Inc.
- Country: US
- Based in: New York City
- Language: English
- ISSN: 1747-9320

Above magazine started as a biannual publication dedicated to sustainability and environmental protection. Its motto is "For The Earth". The first issue came out in the summer of 2009. The magazine was actually a reboot of what was formally a fashion magazine following its purchase by Centoria Limited. Guest edited by Charlotte Casiraghi, it was distributed by Comag, a division of Condé Nast and sold in retailers like Barnes & Noble. Articles in this first issue were written by Robert F. Kennedy Jr. and David de Rothschild. There was an interview of the fashion designer Stella McCartney as well as Roberto Saviano, the author of Gomorrah. Casiraghi was said to be "instrumental" in securing the Saviano interview, which was conducted by Beatrice Borromeo.

Above has been described as "cutting edge", a magazine using luxury, fashion, art ("eco-art"), photography, architecture, and design to raise awareness of the endangered environment. The magazine is the brainchild of editor-in-chief Nicolas Rachline, grandson of Publicis founder Marcel Bleustein-Blanchet. Rachline told Reuters: "Our goal is to become the destination publication for information and hopefully inspiration, about how to save beauty and preserve the environment on both collective and individual levels."

There were four issues:

- Head Above Water (June 2009)
- For the Earth (December 2009)
- A "Spring Issue" (April 2010)
- A "Fall Issue" (October 2010)

== See also ==
- Ever Manifesto
- System (magazine)
