= Eugénie Musayidire =

Rwandan human rights activist and writer

Eugénie Musayidire (born 1952) is a human rights activist and writer who was born in Rwanda. An ethnic Tutsi, she left the country in 1973 after being threatened by Hutu extremists, moving first to Burundi and later to Germany as a political refugee. In 1994, she lost most of her family and relatives during the Rwandan genocide, an event she covered in her 1999 book Mein Stein spricht (My Stone Speaks). In 2007, she was awarded the International Nuremberg Human Rights Prize for her efforts to reconcile the Tutsi and Hutu communities.

== Biography ==
Born in Rwanda on 25 December 1952, Eugénie Musayidire is an ethnic Tutsi. In 1973, when she learnt that Hutu extremists were about to arrest her, she fled to Burundi where she attended the University of Burundi, studying economics and social sciences. In 1977, she arrived in Germany as a political refugee, successful claiming right of asylum. After completing training as a pharmaceutical technician in 1985, she established a family and worked in Siegburg's migration and integration department.

While in Germany, she learnt that her mother, her brother's family and 22 other relatives had been murdered in 1994 by a neighbour who had once been a close friend. Totally confused, she discussed the event in Mein Stein spricht (1999) and in 2001 travelled to her native village in Rwanda where she met her mother's murderer. The trip was the subject of a television documentary by Martin Buchholz, Der Mörder meiner Mutter. Eine Frau will Gerechtigkeit (The Murder of My Mother. A Woman Seeks Justice), which received the Grimme-Preis in 2003.

Realizing the importance of reconciliation between the Tutsis and the Hutus, in 2001 she founded "Hope in Rwanda" offering meeting places and therapeutic assistance. In 2003, she established "IZERE", a therapy centre in Nyanza serving children and young adults. As a result of these efforts, at a ceremony in the Nuremberg Opera House on 30 September 2007 Eugénie Musayidire was awarded the International Nuremberg Human Rights Prize.
