= Ever Manifesto =

British free print publication

EVER Manifesto
- EVER Bamboo cover
- Founders: Elizabeth von Guttman, Alexia Niedzielski, Charlotte Casiraghi
- Categories: Sustainability, fashion
- First issue: October 2009
- Country: UK
- Based in: London
- Language: English
- Website: Evermanifesto.com (defunct)

EVER Manifesto is a free print publication focusing on fashion and sustainability. It is distributed at fashion shows and selected stores as well as published in PDF for its now defunct, though archived, website.

The second issue of EVER Manifesto -EVER Bamboo- was released in October 2011.

The offices of the magazine are located on the third floor of the Biscuit Building at 10 Redchurch Street, London, England.

The founders of the publication (Charlotte Casiraghi, Alexia Niedzielski, and Elizabeth von Guttman) announced its creation, website, and forthcoming debut manifesto in September 2009. The announcement coincided with a press conference for Città dell'arte Fashion: Bio Ethical Sustainable Trend.

== Modus operandi ==
With the catch phrase "everlution" (a neologism), the website for the magazine declares: "Fashion is change and reinvention. Sustainability is just the next step. Break the rhythm of fashion. March to a new drum. The magazine aims to "inspire positive transformation in how we live by generating sustainable solutions for both work and play that are aimed at protecting our planet for future generations." The magazine is intended to stimulate thought, debate, and change for improvement.

The publication is distributed for free at the 10 Corso Como boutique during Milan Fashion Week and again at Colette in Paris during Paris Fashion Week. Casiraghi explained that the magazine will not have a predetermined publication schedule. "We want to publish when we have something to say or people to support," she said. "It will be short and meaningful so that people will read it." The staff collaborate with experts and researchers to publish new issues ("manifestos," as they call it on the website) when there are new developments. Thus, there is no set schedule for the frequency of publication. Each "manifesto" will focus on a specific and unique theme that unites the field of science and the arts in a vision of sustainability.

== Everlution ==
The first issue of Ever Manifesto was released in October 2009. It was Guest Edited by Vogue Italia's Franca Sozzani. Contributors included Derek Blasberg, Burak Cakmak, Laura Lazzaroni and Duro Olowu.

Everlution focused on consumer attitudes towards sustainability in fashion – "Just as we have become accustomed to asking the provenance of what we put in our bodies, today the question of where and how the clothes we put on our bodies are made is becoming just as familiar, and as important. Clothes, like art, music and architecture, are a reflection of the time in which they are created. Yet in comparison – particularly with that other design discipline that accommodates the body, architecture – fashion trails way behind".

The trio of editors-in-chief (Casiraghi, Neidzielski, and Von Guttman) characterized their project as an attempt to make environmentalism more "seductive" and, therefore, appealing. Casiraghi said: "A manifesto is different from a magazine. It's a very direct form of communication.... We want to show that you can change things. Maybe not the whole world—but things."

== EVER Bamboo ==
On 2 June 2011, in anticipation of the upcoming second issue of Ever Manifesto – EVER Bamboo- the founders of the publication hosted an event together with Andrea della Valle, and Stefano Tonchi. Artists Mike and Doug Starn were commissioned to create a bamboo structure in Venice. It stretched upwards over the buildings allowing the spectators to see a unique view of the famous Italian city and its channels from within the bamboo structure.

On 5 October 2011 Elizabeth von Guttman, Alexia Niedzielski and Charlotte Casiraghi launched EVER Bamboo in Paris. The new issue, guest edited by W's Stefano Tonchi in partnership with Gucci, focuses on bamboo as a sustainable and versatile material. "We joined forces with Gucci, the sponsors of this issue, to inspire the next generation of creative talents. Together, we launched a design competition with students from the IFM fashion school in Paris and challenged them to create a bag that incorporated sustainable principles and used bamboo in an innovative way, to be sold online and in selected Gucci boutiques; filmmaker Loic Prigent to document the process from beginning to end."

Alongside the launch of EVER Bamboo, Gucci's Creative Director Frida Giannini and the team of Ever Manifesto, in collaboration with l'Institut Français de la Mode (IFM), organised a sustainable fashion competition. The three finalists were able to produce prototypes of their bags with the artisans of Gucci Florence. The students were to draw inspiration from the famous Gucci Bamboo Bag, bringing together the values of innovation, charm and authenticity with a low environmental impact. "Our mission at Ever Manifesto is to challenge the thought process behind modern creative processes and consumption, and to question how we approach the world that surrounds us so that we can make the world a greener and more ecologically aware place. Bamboo is only one example of how we can curb our use of non-renewable materials; if we all take the time to think about the choices we make, we're bound to find better ways to protect our environment while enhancing our wellbeing."
The winner of the sustainability contest is Laura Popoviciu, with a handbag model - featured as Vogue America's October issue Style Ethic selection. The “Ever Manifesto Bamboo Bag” was produced by Gucci as a limited edition series available in Gucci boutiques in New York, Paris, Rome, London and Tokyo as well as on gucci.com in France and the US.

== EVER Conscious ==
The third issue of "EVER" was a compilation of interviews of various artists, celebrities, and thinkers. Although it was the third overall, it was the first issue where Casiraghi was not one of the editors-in-chief. Casiraghi was still listed as a founder, but only Niedzielski and Von Guttman held the title of editor-in-chief for this issue. Lily Cole, Matthew Stone, Fabiola Beracasa Beckman, Claire Nouvian, Daniel Pinchbeck, Eva Kruse, Ben Goldsmith, Daniel de la Falaise, Graham Hill, Pharrell Williams, Mimi Xu, Julie Gilhart, Cecilia Dean and David Selig, Yves Béhar, Dianna Cohen, Amber Valletta, Lewis Perkins, Elettra Wiedemann, Bruno Pieters, and Carsten Höller all were interviewed by editor Xerxes Cook to talk about deeper awareness, mindfulness, and "conscious style, transformation, and sustainability as a way of life." Niedzielski and Von Guttman, who are also the founders of the biannual, fashion insider System magazine, told the press that EVER Conscious would be the "last manifesto."

== See also ==
- Above magazine
- Environmentalism
- Environmentally friendly
- Reuse
- Slow fashion
- System magazine
