= Ruzagayura famine =

Famine in Ruanda-Urundi during World War II

Ruzagayura famine Ruzagayura
- Country: Ruanda-Urundi (modern-day Rwanda and Burundi)
- Location: Kingdom of Rwanda
- Period: 1943–1944
- Total deaths: 36,000–50,000
- Consequences: Mass emigration to surrounding countries; political destabilisation

The Ruzagayura famine (lit. 'search and find little') was a major famine which occurred in the Belgian mandate of Ruanda-Urundi (modern-day Rwanda and Burundi) during World War II. It led to numerous deaths and a huge population migration out of the territory and into the neighboring Belgian Congo and surrounding areas. The famine is considered to have begun in October 1943 and ended in December 1944.

The principal cause of the famine was several prolonged periods of drought in the region in early 1943. However, the problem was exacerbated by attempts of the colonial authorities to send agricultural produce to the Belgian Congo, as part of the Allied war effort, in World War II.

The colonial administration, together with Christian missionaries, began to transport food to a supply point in Usumbura (presently Bujumbura). The Rwandan king, Mutara III Rudahigwa, sent aid to the affected region.

By the time the famine ended in December 1944, between 36,000 and 50,000 people (between one-fifth and one-third of the total regional population) died of hunger in the territory.

Several hundred thousand people emigrated away from Ruanda-Urundi, most to the Belgian Congo but also to Uganda as well. The migration also served to create further political instability in the areas affected by the mass influx of Rwandans.

== Depictions ==
The famine is the main focus of the first story of Scholastique Mukasonga's Kibogo, a novel set in 1940s Rwanda.

== Bibliography ==
- Singiza, Dantès (2011). La Famine Ruzagayura (Rwanda, 1943-1944): causes, Conséquences et réactions des autorités (PDF) (in French). Tervueren: Royal Museum of Central Africa.
