= Immaculée Ilibagiza =

Rwandan-American author and motivational speaker

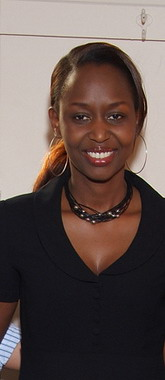
- Ilibagiza in 2007
- Born: 1970 (age 55–56); Mataba, Rwanda
- Occupations: Author, motivational speaker
- Writing career
- Language: English, French, Kinyarwanda
- Notable works: Left to Tell: Discovering God Amidst the Rwandan Holocaust; Our Lady of Kibeho: Mary Speaks to the World from the Heart of Africa "The boy who met Jesus"
- Notable awards: Christopher Award
- Website: www.immaculee.com

Immaculée Ilibagiza (born 1972) is a Rwandan-American Catholic author and motivational speaker. Her first book, Left to Tell: Discovering God Amidst the Rwandan Holocaust (2006), is an autobiographical work detailing how she survived during the Rwandan genocide.

== Biography ==
In Left to Tell, Immaculée Ilibagiza shares of her experience during the 1994 Rwandan genocide. She survived hidden for 91 days with seven other women in a small bathroom, no larger than 3 feet (0.91 m) by 4 feet (1.2 m) (an area of 12 square feet). The bathroom was concealed in a room behind a wardrobe in the home of a Hutu Lutheran pastor. During the genocide, most of Ilibagiza's family (her mother, her father, and her two brothers Damascene and Vianney) were killed by Hutu Interahamwe soldiers. Besides herself, the only other survivor in her family was her brother Aimable, who was studying out of the country in Senegal and did not know of the genocide. Ilibagiza shares how her Catholic faith guided her through her ordeal and describes her eventual forgiveness and compassion toward her family's killers.

Ilibagiza's second book, Led by Faith: Rising from the ashes of the Rwandan Holocaust (2008), picks up where she left off in Left to Tell. She tells her story of survival immediately following the genocide she had lived through. It describes how her faith in God kept her going as she struggled to find her place in the world again, and it also shows how she sought out and encouraged many of the orphans who were equally lost. She finally finds a safe refuge in the United States where she is able to look back at everything she had been through. It is in this safe place where she has the potential to reflect on why she lived through the experience at all.

In 2013, Ilibagiza became a naturalized U.S. citizen. She studied electrical and mechanical engineering at the National University of Rwanda.

== In popular media ==
In 2006, a documentary short about her story, The Diary of Immaculée, was released by Academy Award–nominated documentarians Peter LeDonne and Steve Kalafer.

She was featured on one of Wayne Dyer's PBS programs, and also on a December 3, 2006, segment of 60 Minutes (which re-aired on July 1, 2007)

== Honors ==
Ilibagiza speaks all over the world and is the recipient of the 2007 Mahatma Gandhi Reconciliation and Peace Award. In 2012 she was the June 9 speaker for the Robert E. and Bonnie Cone Hooper Plenary Address of the Christian Scholars Conference at Lipscomb University.

She received honorary doctorates from the University of Notre Dame in 2007 and St. John's University in 2008.

== Books ==
- Ilibagiza, Immaculée (with Steve Erwin). Left to Tell: Discovering God Amidst the Rwandan Holocaust. Carlsbad, CA: Hay House, 2006. ISBN 1-4019-0896-9.
- Ilibagiza, Immaculée (with Steve Erwin). Led by Faith: Rising from the Ashes of the Rwandan Genocide. Carlsbad, CA: Hay House, 2008. ISBN 978-1-4019-1887-3
- Ilibagiza, Immaculée (with Steve Erwin). Our Lady of Kibeho: Mary Speaks to the World from the Heart of Africa. Carlsbad, CA: Hay House, 2008. ISBN 1-4019-2378-X
- Ilibagiza, Immaculée. The Boy Who Met Jesus: Segatashya Emmanuel of Kibeho (November 28, 2012) Carlsbad, CA: Hay House ISBN 978-1401935825
- Ilibagiza, Immaculée (with Steve Erwin). The Rosary: The Prayer That Saved My Life(August 15, 2013) Carlsbad, CA: Hay House ISBN 978-1401940171
