= 20 Hoxton Square =

Art gallery in London, England

Coordinates: 51.5282°N 0.0812°W

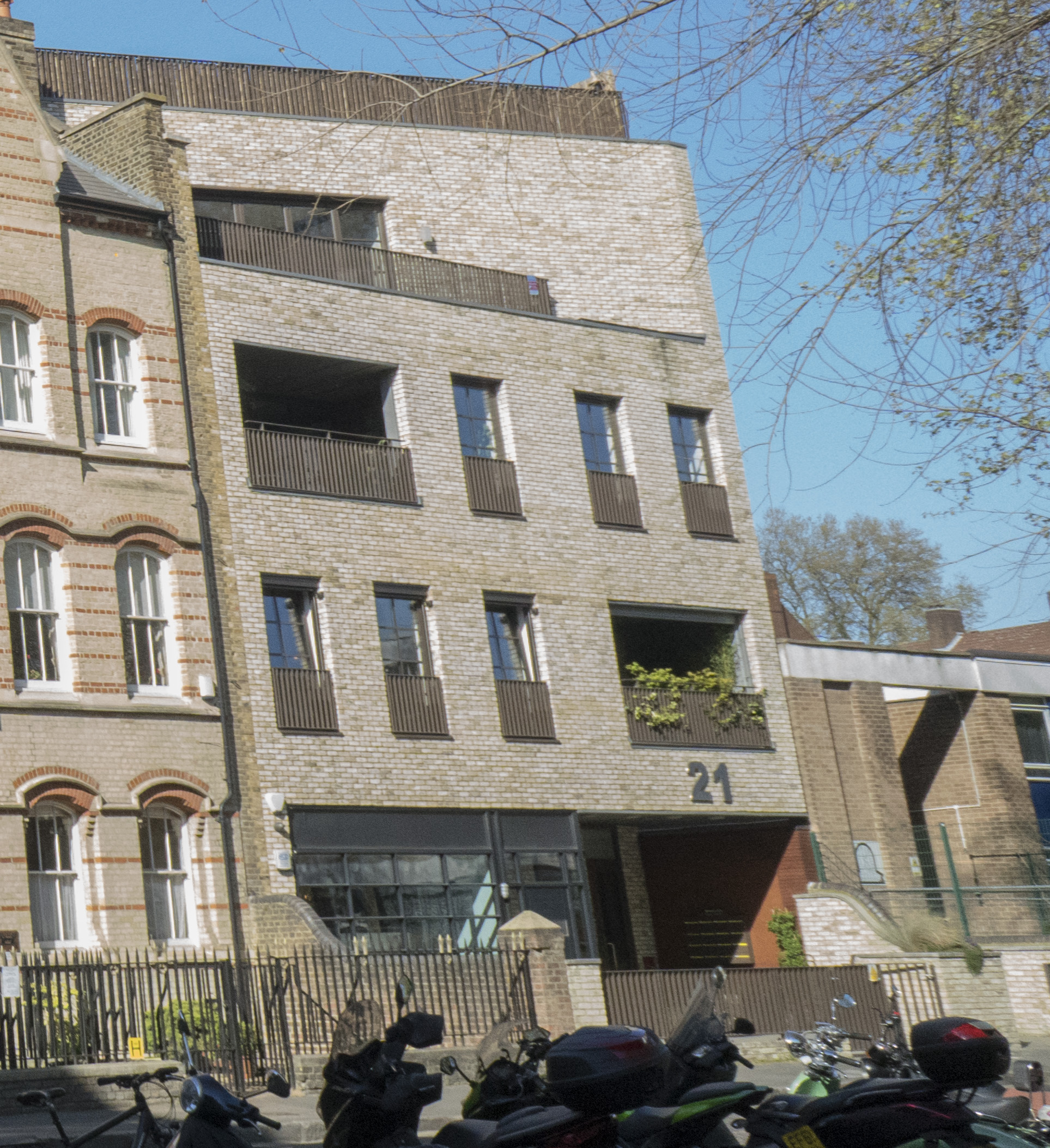
20–21 Hoxton Square

20 Projects, formerly 20 Hoxton Square Projects, was an east London art gallery run by Alex Dellal. Launched in 2007, 20 Projects was a collaborative project space, operating as a platform for emerging contemporary artists, whilst also acting as a creative hub for collaborative and independent projects. The physical location at 20 Hoxton Square is in the former hall of the Catholic Church of St Monica. The building was designed by the London architectural firm DOSarchitects
