= Gitwe, Rwanda =

Town in Rwanda

Gitwe is a town in Ruhango District, Rwanda. It has a university, a college, a market, a hospital, a church, and a bus route to Kigali by East African Bus & Travel, that takes about 3 hours.
