= System (magazine) =

Biannual fashion magazine

- Editorial Board: Elizabeth von Guttman, Jonathan Wingfield, Thomas Lenthal
- Categories: Fashion
- Frequency: Bi-Annual
- Publisher: Paradis
- First issue: 2013
- Country: France
- Based in: Paris
- Language: English
- Website: http://system-magazine.com/
- ISSN: 2052-0808

System magazine is an Anglo-French biannual publication geared toward insiders of the fashion industry. The magazine offers long-format conversations with relevant individuals within the fashion industry, accompanied by portfolios created by image-makers.

== History and inspiration ==
System derives its name from the name of a successful historical American magazine, "the magazine of business," introduced by A.W. Shaw in 1900.

Founded by Alexia Niedzielski, Elizabeth von Guttman, Jonathan Wingfield, and Thomas Lenthal in 2003, System was initially published by Tartan Publishing, which Niedziedski co-founded.

Mike Obenson acquired the publication in 2020. Under his ownership, System continued to evolve, with the launch of its annual sister publication, System Beauty, in 2022, alongside the expansion of its digital formats.

== Relaunch ==
In December 2024, it was announced that the original team - Elizabeth von Guttman, Thomas Lenthal, and Jonathan Wingfield - reacquired the title. In May 2025, the three launched a new bi-annual "System Collections" which offers a “time capsule” of key looks from fashion month.

== Editorial board ==
Elizabeth von Guttman, Thomas Lenthal, and Jonathan Wingfield are the members of the editorial board for the magazine.

Prior to System, von Guttman worked as contributor at Industrie magazine. She previously worked with Alexia Niedzielski in the founding and editing of Ever Manifesto, a publication focused on sustainability in fashion; Niedzielski and Guttman also co-founded (with Charlotte Casiraghi) Ever Consulting, the publisher of the manifesto. Today von Guttman is increasingly focused on the Altava Group, a metaverse company focused on creativity in fashion through generative AI.

Jonathan Wingfield has previously been editor-in-chief of Numéro and Numéro Homme magazines for twelve years.

Thomas Lenthal has been the creative director of Numéro and French Glamour.

== System magazine ==
- System No. 1 "Back to work with Nicolas Ghesquière"
- System No. 2 "The rules are in my head – Rei Kawabuko"
- System No. 3 "Juergen Teller – How does he do it?"
- System No. 4 "Smells like Lara", "Smells like Saskia", "Smells like Stella", "Smells like Liya"
- System No. 5 "Giorgio Armani's Staying Power"
- System No. 6 "I wanted something calm – Raf Simons"
- System No. 7 "The Happy Couple"
- System No. 8 "Everybody loves Miuccia"
- System No. 9 "Waiting for Rihanna"
- System No. 10 "What is Virgil Abloh?"
- System No. 11 "The Power of Youth" – Cover: Sadie Sink
- System No. 12 "J'adore Kim" – Cover: Kim Jones
- System No. 13 "Angelababy wears Dior", "Fan Chengcheng wears Givenchy", "Ni Ni wears Gucci", "Saint Laurent Rive Droite"
- System No. 14 "Yohji-san" – Cover: Yohji Yamamoto
- System No. 15 "What do we talk about?"
- System No. 16 "The new look" – Cover: Ibrahim Kamara and Rafael Pavarotti
- System No. 17 "The chairman / Counter culture" – Covers: Mr Ji / José Neves
- System No. 18 "The Big Balenciaga Saga" – Cover: Demna
- System No. 19 "OWENSCORP" – Cover: Rick Owens
- System No. 20 "The Saint Laurents" – Cover: Francesca Bellettini and Anthony Vaccarello
- System No. 21 "Tenth-anniversary issue"
- System No. 22 "That's Entertainment!" – Cover: Pharrell Williams
- System No. 23 "Whole Lotta Love" – Cover: Lotta Volkova
- System No. 24 "Photographed by" – Cover: Juergen Teller, The Sorrentis, David Sims, Inez & Vinoodh, Nadia Lee Cohen, Malick Bodian, Zhong Lin, Luis Alberto Rodriguez

=== System Beauty ===
- System Beauty No. 1 "Michèle Lamy"
- System Beauty No. 1 "Isamaya Ffrench"
- System Beauty No. 1 "Piergiorgio Del Moro"

=== System Collection ===
- System Collections No. 1 "Autumn/Winter 2025-2026"
- System Collections No. 2 "Spring/Summer 2026"

== Notable features ==
Collier Schorr photographed Charlotte Casiraghi in the eighth issue of the magazine. In a gender fluid framework, Casiraghi modeled clothing from the Gucci menswear line. Schorr's objective was to challenge notions of constructed gender identity, with Casiraghi as a muse ("Gucci muse with a royal bloodline") whose heritage (as a granddaughter of Grace Kelly and a Grimaldi scion) links her with archetypes associated with Hollywood and royalty.

System no.18 came with a supplement produced by Les Rendez-vous Littéraire rue Cambon, edited by Charlotte Casiraghi, and featuring actress Keira Knightley, literary scholar Fanny Arama, and literary critic Erica Wagner. The supplement highlighted the literature and lives of Virginia Woolf and Gabrielle Chanel, especially the way these women led movements of freer expression for women, i.e. Woolf's influence with the Bloomsbury Group and how the founder of Chanel led the fashion to give women free movement.
