= Malaika Uwamahoro =

Rwandan actress, poet, singer and activist (born 1990)

- Born: Malaika Uwamahoro; 1991 (age 34–35); Rwanda
- Education: Theatre Studies, Fordham University
- Alma mater: Fordham University
- Occupations: Actress; Poet; Singer; Activist
- Known for: Our Lady of the Nile (2019); Miracle in Rwanda (2018); Yankee Hustle (TV series 2018–)

Malaika Uwamahoro (formerly Angel Uwamahoro, born 1990) is a Rwandan-born actress, poet, singer, and social justice activist. She resides in Portland, Maine, United States.

== Early life and education ==
Uwamahoro was born in Rwanda in 1990. Due to events leading to the subsequent 1994 Genocide against the Tutsi, her mother fled with her to Uganda where she lived for seven years, then to the United States and finally in 2001, back to Rwanda. She obtained a Bachelor of Arts degree in Theatre Studies at Fordham University, New York City.

== Career ==
=== Film ===
She featured in Tomas Petkovski's 2018 film, LoveLess Generation. In a television series created in the same year by Tola Olatunji titled, Yankee Hustle, also featuring Jide Kosoko, Uche Jombo, Kara Rainer and others, she plays the role of "Princess".

In 2019, she was featured in the film directed by the Franco-Afghan filmmaker Atiq Rahimi, Our Lady of the Nile (French: Notre-Dame du Nil). She also made her debut stage play, Miracle in Rwanda again featured in the off-Broadway play by Leslie Lewis Sword and Edward Vilga titled, Miracle in Rwanda. For this play, she was nominated in the Best Solo Performance category at the 2019 VIV Award.

=== Music ===
She was featured by Mucyo (a Rwandan singer) in a song titled Stickin' 2 You, produced by Eloi El.

=== Poetry and others ===
She performed at the International Day of Reflection on the Genocide in Rwanda in 2017. She was named as one of the performers at the 2019 DanceAfrica event. In 2020, during the lockdown, she was said to have written the poem, I Don't Mind!.

She was one of the speakers nominated to speak at the Forbes Woman Africa 2020 Leading Women Summit, held in Durban, South Africa.

== Filmography ==
=== Films ===
Year	Film	Role	Notes	Ref.
2019	Our Lady of the Nile	Actress (Immaculée as Angel Uwamahoro)	Drama	
2018	LoveLess Generation	Actress	Short film, Comedy, Drama	
2018	Miracle in Rwanda	Lead actress	Play	

=== Television ===
Year	Film	Role	Notes	Ref.
2018 –	Yankee Hustle	Actress (Princess)	TV series	

== Accolades ==
Year	Event	Prize	Recipient	Result
2019	VIV	Solo Performance	Herself	Nominated
