= Benjamin Sehene =

Rwandan author

Benjamin Sehene (born 1959) is a Rwandan author whose work primarily focuses on questions of identity and the events surrounding the Rwandan genocide. He spent much of his life in Canada and lives in France.

== Early life and education ==
Benjamin Sehene was born in Kigali, Rwanda, in 1959 to a Tutsi family.

His family fled Rwanda owing to ethnic tensions and massacres of Tutsi people in 1963 for Uganda. They were lucky to escape owing to Benjamin's older brother, who was working for United States embassy in Kigali at the time and was able to evacuate the family.

Benjamin grew up and went to school in Uganda.

He studied in Paris at Sorbonne University in the early 1980s.

== Career ==
In 1984 Sehene immigrated to Canada, and started to write in 1988.

After moving to Paris, in 1994 the Rwandan genocide took place. Sehene travelled back to Rwanda to witness and write about what he saw. He rediscovered childhood sensations buried in his memory, as well as his mother tongue, Kinyarwanda. Returning to Paris, it took him nearly four years to develop his impressions in writing. Based on what his experiences, Sehene wrote the essay Le Piège ethnique (1999), published in English as The Ethnic Trap.

In 2005 Sehene prepared a documentary retracing the scattering of the members of his own family, in Toronto, Buenos Aires, Paris, and Kigali. Their common thread was a quest for identity: all carry within them the Rwandan genocide and its beginnings. He was very concerned about the future of Rwanda and the Great Lakes region. He supported the African Renaissance, hopeful of its possibility after observing the example of South Africa.

Also in 2005 he was writing a novel about emigration and the fate of young people of the second and third generations of Rwandans.

He wrote Le Feu sous la soutane (Fire under the Cassock) (2005), an historical novel focusing on the true story of a Hutu Catholic priest, Father Wenceslas Munyeshyaka, who offered protection to Tutsi refugees in his church before sexually exploiting the women and participating in massacres. The novel was the first francophone Rwandan novel published since the 1994 genocide.

Sehene also contributes articles to the online newspaper rue89, and is a member of PEN International.

== Residence ==
In 2002 Sehene was living in Canada; in 2005 he was living in the La Chapelle district of Paris, where he was still living in 2008; by October 2010 he was back in France.

== Publications ==
- Le Piège Ethnique(The Ethnic Trap), Éditions Dagorno, Paris, (1999) ISBN 2-910019-54-3
- Rwanda's collective amnesia, in The UNESCO Courier, (1999).
- Un sentiment d'insécurité, Play, Paris, 2001
- "Dead Girl Walking" (short story)
- Le Feu sous la soutane (Fire under the Cassock), L'Esprit Frappeur, Paris (2005) ISBN 2-84405-222-3
- "Ta Race!" (Short story), Éditions Vents d'Ailleurs, [La Roque d'Anthéron], France, 2006 ISBN 2-911412-40-0
- Die ethnische Falle Wespennest 2006
