= Agnès Gyr-Ukunda =

Rwandan publisher and founder of Éditions Bakame

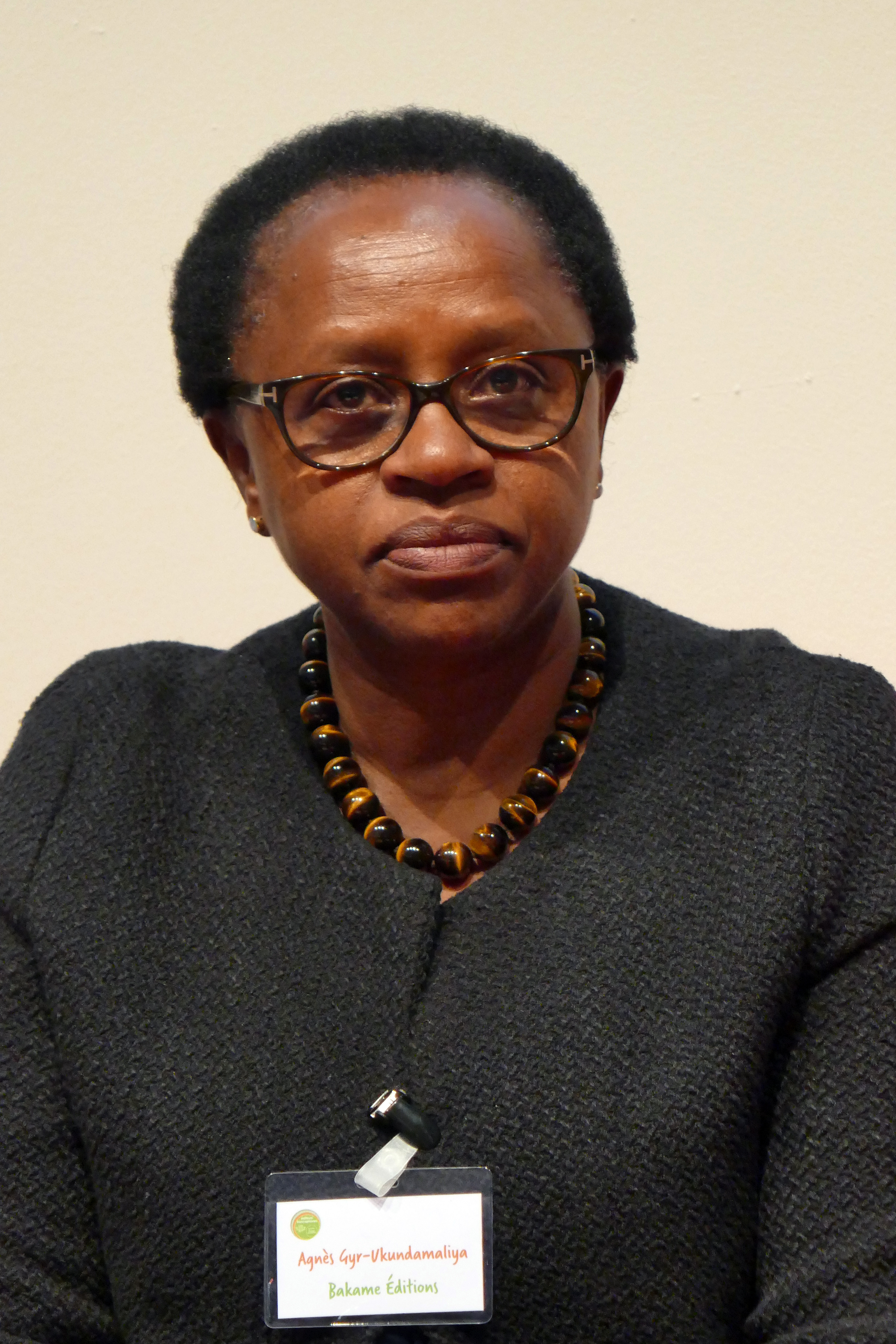
- Gyr-Ukunda in 2017
- Born: 1956 (age 69–70); Rwanda
- Occupations: Publisher, philanthropist
- Known for: Éditions Bakame

Agnès Gyr-Ukunda (born 1956) is a Rwandan publisher and founder of Éditions Bakame, a not-for-profit publishing house of Rwandan children's literature.

== Early life ==
Gyr-Ukunda was born in Rwanda in 1956, where she was educated. The 1973 Rwandan coup d'état forced her family to flee to neighboring Burundi. In 1980, Gyr-Ukunda moved to Switzerland.

== Career ==
=== Éditions Bakame ===
Amidst the Rwandan genocide of the 1990s, Gyr-Ukunda felt compelled to do something for the children of her country, despite living far away in Switzerland. In 1995, Gyr-Ukunda founded Éditions Bakame with her husband, Rwanda's only publishing house for children's books. It arose during a time when there was concern to translate traditional Rwandan oral literature to written prose.

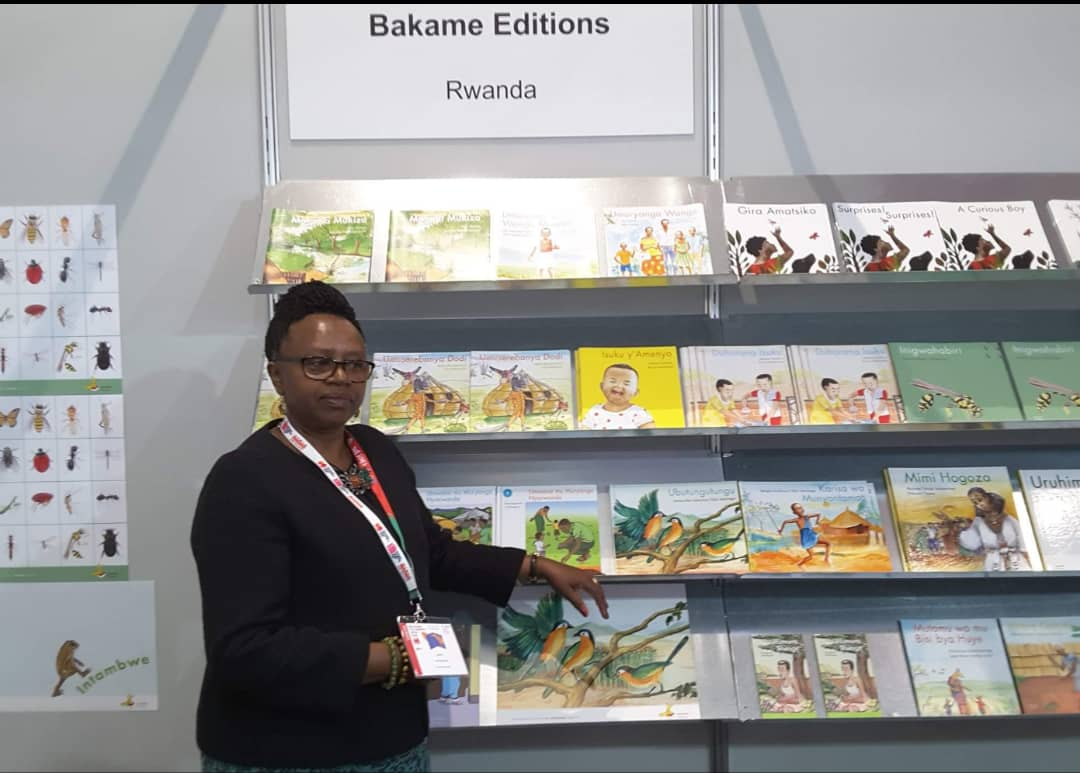
Gyr-Ukunda in front of a shelf of Éditions Bakame books

Éditions Bakame publishes story books, as well as young adult novels and picture books. Since its establishment, Éditions Bakame has sold around half a million copies of its titles, all published in Kinyarwanda, Rwanda's official language. Éditions Bakame prints about 3 new titles each year. Its books are distributed to schools and libraries.

Gyr-Ukunda believes that books can help Rwanda's youth deal with the recent tramatizing events in Rwanda's history, such as the Rwandan genocide. At the same time, Éditions Bakame provides opportunities for Rwandan storytellers and illustrators to gain work experience.

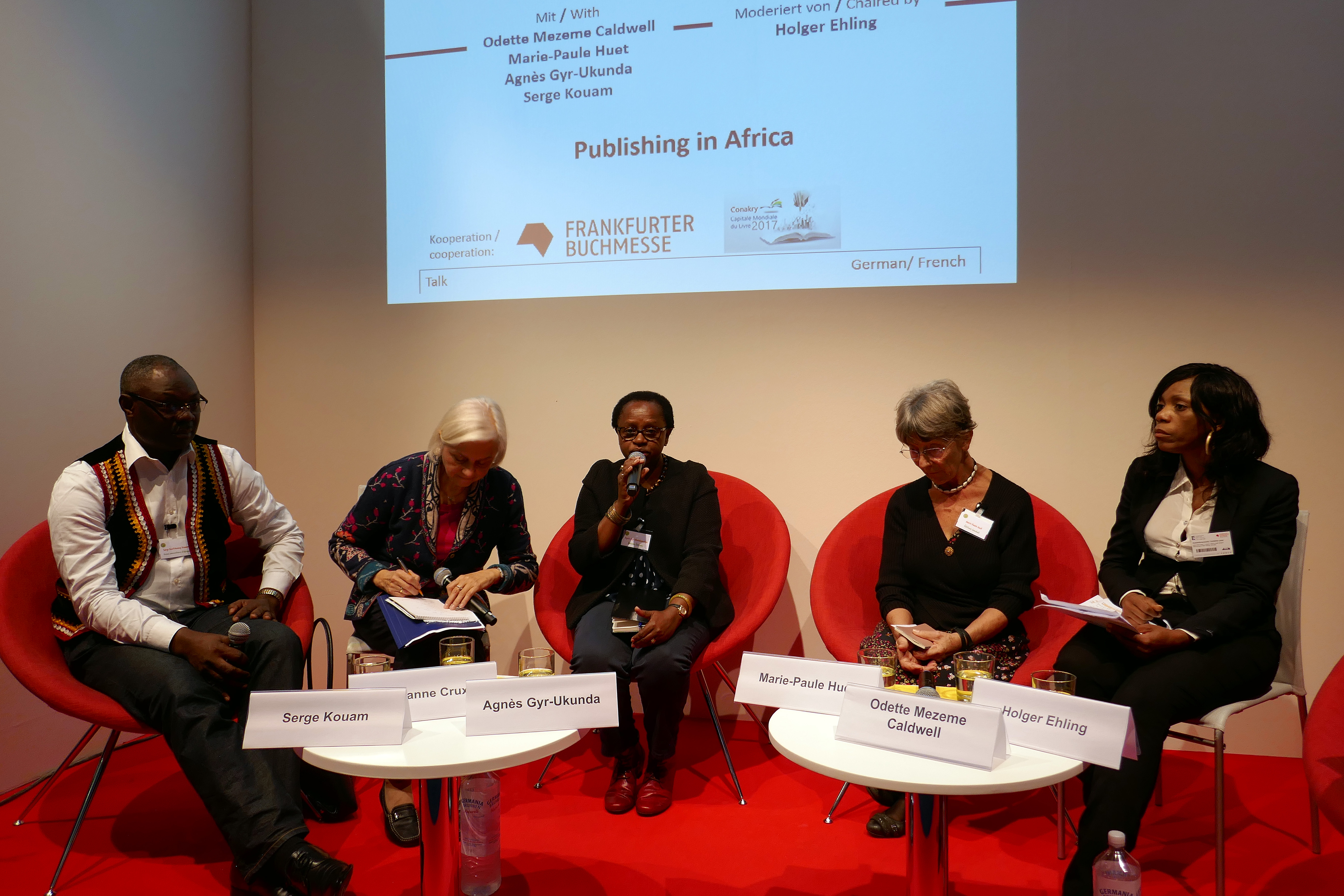
Round table on publishing in Africa, 2017. Gyr-Ukunda is center.

=== Books for Rwandan Children ===
Gyr-Ukunda is also a founder of the Non-governmental organization Books for Rwandan Children. The NGO has offered courses African illustrators and writers, as well as "rucksack libraries" of books to give to schools.

== See also ==
- Publishing in African Languages Using Editions Bakame as a Model by Agnès Gyr-Ukunda
