= Pharmaceutical technician =

Laboratory or research assistant

A pharmaceutical technician, also referred to as pharmaceutical research technician is a job title for a laboratory assistant or research assistant employed in the pharmaceutical industry involved in the research and development of new or existing medications. In most cases, job responsibilities include supervising ongoing experiments, recording laboratory results, keeping records, testing for various compounds, and maintaining laboratory cleanliness. More responsibilities are typically given as the pharmaceutical technician gains experience in laboratory techniques and proper research methodology.

== Educational experience and certification ==
Most pharmaceutical technicians have completed 2 years at a college or technical institute. Additional training in laboratory technique may be on-the-job. Some states in the United States offer 1-year training programs for pharmaceutical technicians. In addition, some pharmaceutical technicians may be students majoring in pharmacy or biological sciences assisting research professors in their work.
