= Archipelago Books =

American not-for-profit publisher of translated literature

- Founded: 2003
- Founder: Jill Schoolman
- Country of origin: United States
- Headquarters location: Brooklyn, New York
- Distribution: Hanover Publisher Services
- Nonfiction topics: Essays
- Fiction genres: Literature in translation
- Imprints: Elsewhere Editions
- Official website: archipelagobooks.org

Archipelago Books is an American not-for-profit publisher dedicated to promoting "cross-cultural exchange through international literature in translation." Located in Brooklyn, New York, it publishes small to mid-size runs of international fiction, poetry, and literary essays. The press was founded in 2003 by Jill Schoolman. On marking its 10th anniversary, Archipelago had published one hundred books, translated from more than twenty-six languages into English. As of the 15th anniversary in 2018, the company was publishing 15 to 16 books per year with a full-time staff of three.

Archipelago was the 2008 winner of the Miriam Bass Award for Creativity in Independent Publishing, given by the Association of American Publishers.

Archipelago's best-known authors include Elias Khoury, Julio Cortázar, Mahmoud Darwish, Scholastique Mukasonga, Nobel Prize-laureate Halldór Laxness, Breyten Breytenbach, Karl Ove Knausgård, Mircea Cărtărescu, Louis Couperus, Heinrich Heine, Novalis, Hugo Claus, Rainer Maria Rilke, Heinrich von Kleist, and Jacques Poulin.
