= List of compositions by Ernst Krenek =

This is an incomplete list of the works of the Austrian, later American, composer Ernst Krenek (1900–1991). His complete output includes 242 works with Opus numbers, created between 1917 and 1989. There are also at least 130 works by Krenek that were not given official Opus numbers.

== Operas ==
See List of operas by Ernst Krenek.

== Ballets ==
- Mammon, Op. 37 (1925)
- Der vertauschte Cupido, Op. 38 (1925)
- Eight Column Line, Op. 85 (1939)

== Vocal music ==
Choral

For mixed choir (SATB) unless otherwise indicated; "female choir" indicates SSAA; "male choir" indicates TTBB unless otherwise indicated

- Drei Gemischte Chöre (Matthias Claudius), Op. 22 (1923)
- Vier kleine Männerchöre for alto and male choir, Op. 32 (1924)
- Die Jahreszeiten (Hölderlin), Op. 35 (1925)
- Der Triumph der Empfindsamkeit (Goethe) for voice, mixed choir and orchestra, Op. 43 (1925)*
- Vier a-cappella-Chöre (Goethe), Op. 47 (1926)
- Kleine Kantate (Goethe), Op. 51 (1927)
- Drei gemischte Chöre (Gottfried Keller), Op. 61 (1929)
- Kantate von der Vergänglichkeit des Irdischen for soprano, mixed choir and piano, Op. 72 (1932)
- Jagd im Winter (Franz Grillparzer) for male choir, horns, and timpani, Op. 74 (1933)*
- Vier österreichische Volkslieder, Op. 77a (1934)
- Symeon der Stylit for tenor, baritone, male choir, mixed choir, and orchestra, Op. 78b (1936)
- Two Choruses on Jacobean Poems for female choir, Op. 87 (1939)
- Proprium missae in festo SS. Innocentium martyrum (die 28 Decembris) (propers for the Feast of the Holy Innocents), Op. 89 (1940)
- Lamentatio Jeremiae prophetae, Op. 93 (1942)
- Cantata for Wartime – Mitternacht und Tag (Herman Melville) for soprano, female choir and orchestra, Op. 95 (1943)
- Fünf Gebete (John Donne) for female choir, Op. 97 (1944)
- The Santa Fé Timetable, Op. 102 (1945)
- Aegrotavit Ezechias for alto, SSA female choir and piano, Op. 103 (1945)
- In paradisium for SMA female choir, Op. 106 (1946)
- Oh would I were, Op. 109 (1946)
- Remember now for SMA female choir and piano, Op. 115a (1947)
- Choruses for mixed choir and organ or piano, Op. 138 (1953)
- Motette zur Opferung für das ganze Kirchenjahr (Veni Sanctificator) for SABar choir and alto saxophone, Op. 141 (1954)
- Proprium missae in Domenica tertia in quadragesima (propers for Gaudete Sunday) for SAB choir, Op. 143 (1955)
- Psalmverse zur Kommunion für das ganze Kirchenjahr, (text from Psalms and John 6) Op. 149 (1955)
- Ich singe wieder, wenn es tagt (Walther von der Vogelweide) for mixed choir and strings, Op. 151 (1956)
- Guten Morgen, Amerika (Carl Sandburg), Op. 159 (1956)
- Missa duodecim tonorum for mixed choir and organ, Op. 165 (1957–8)
- Sechs Motetten nach Worten von Franz Kafka, Op. 169 (1959)
- Three Madrigals, three motets (madrigals by Shakespeare, Robert Herrick and Tennyson; motets from Ecclesiastes and Psalms) for SSA female choir, Op. 174 (1960)
- Jedermann (Hugo von Hofmannsthal) for 2 voices, mixed choir, organ and chamber orchestra, Op. 176 (1961)*
- O Holy Ghost, Op. 186a (1964)
- Proprium für das Dreifaltigkeitsfest (propers for Trinity Sunday) for soprano, mixed choir, 2 trumpets, timpani and organ, Op. 195 (1967)
- Proprium missae (propers for the Nativity of Mary) for mixed choir, clarinet, 2 trumpets, viola, percussion and organ, Op. 202 (1968)*
- Deutsche Messe (Ordinarium) for mixed choir, clarinet, trumpet, 2 trombones, percussion and organ, Op. 204 (1968)
- Messe "Gib uns den Frieden" for SATB soloists, mixed choir and orchestra, Op. 208 (1970)
- Three Lessons, (text by the composer) Op. 210 (1971)
- Settings of Poems by William Blake, Op. 226 (1976)
- Missa in festo SS. Trinitatis As-Dur for mixed choir and organ, WoO 8 (1913)*
- Große Ostersonate for tenor, mixed choir and organ, WoO 9 (1914)*
- Die Sterne (Carl Adolf Frederich Fuchs) for male choir and piano, WoO 10 (1914)*
- Zwischen Erd' und Himmel (Robert Hamerling) for SATB soloists, mixed choir, violin solo, and orchestra, WoO 25 (1916)*
- Über Einem Grabe (Conrad Ferdinand Meyer) for SATB soloists, 2 mixed choirs and orchestra, WoO 29 (1916)*
- Kanons und Fugen for choir and piano, WoO 35 (1917)*
- Gott gib dein Gericht dem König, WoO 49 (1918)*
- Kalender / Chöre für einen geplanten Kalender-Zyklus for male choir, WoO 77 (1930)*
- Wach auf mein Hort, WoO 81 (1930)*
- Von den Leiden des Menschen for choir and orchestra, WoO 82 (1932)*
- Symeon der Stylit for SMTBar soloists, mixed choir and piano, WoO 84 [Op. 78b] (1936)*
- Unvollendeter Chor, WoO 86a (1943)* (unfinished; sketch)
- Spiritus Sanctus, WoO 89 (1948)* (sketch)
- Deutsche Messgesänge zum 29. Sonntag im Jahreskreis for speaker, tenor, mixed choir and organ, WoO 101 (1980)*

Solo vocal

For voice and piano unless otherwise indicated

- Lieder (Gerd Hans Goering), Op. 9 (1922)
- Lieder (Karl Kraus), Op. 13b (1924)
- Lieder (Guido Gezelle and Franz Werfel), Op. 15 (1922Über)
- Lieder (Otfried Krzyzanowski and Friedrich Gottlieb Klopstock), Op. 19 (1923)
- Szene der Eurydike for soprano and orchestra, Op. 21a (from Orpheus und Eurydike, Op. 21) (1923)
- Lieder (Gerd Hans Goering and Hans Reinhart), Op. 30 (1924)
  - Drei Lieder (Verhaeren) for mezzo-soprano and clarinet quintet, Op. 30a (1925)*
- Wechsellied zum Tanz (Goethe), Op. 43a (1926)
  - Wechsellied zum Tanz (Goethe) for soprano and orchestra, Op. 43a (1926)
  - Suite aus der Musik zu "Triumph der Empfindsamkeit" von Goethe, Op. 43a (1927)
- Das Lied für Rosalinde, Op. 45a (1926)
- O Lacrymosa (text written for Krenek by Rainer Maria Rilke), Op. 48 (1926)
  - O Lacrymosa (Rilke) for soprano and ensemble, Op. 48a (1926)
- Vier Gesänge (various), Op. 53 (1927)
  - Vier Gesänge (various) for mezzo-soprano and 6 wind instruments, Op. 53a (1927)
- Drei Gesänge (Goethe), Op. 56 (1927)
- Monolog der Stella (Goethe), Op. 57 (1928)
  - Monolog der Stella (Goethe) for soprano and orchestra, Op. 57a (1928)
- Reisebuch aus den österreichischen Alpen (text by the composer), Op. 62 (1929)
  - Acht Lieder aus "Reisebuch aus den österreichischen Alpen" (text by the composer) for baritone and orchestra, Op. 62a (1929)
  - Reisebuch aus den österreichischen Alpen (text by the composer), Op. 62b (1960)
- Fiedellieder (Mommsen and Storm Theodor), Op. 64 (1930)
- Durch die Nacht (Karl Kraus), Op. 67 (1931)
  - Durch die Nacht (Kraus) for soprano and orchestra, Op. 67a (1931)
- Die Nachtigall (Kraus), Op. 68 (1931)
  - Die Nachtigall (Kraus) for soprano, 2 flutes and strings, Op. 68a (1931)
- Gesänge des späten Jahres (text by the composer), Op. 71 (1931)
- Das Schweigen (Eberhard Friedrich von Gemmingen), Op. 75 (1933)*
- Während der Trennung (Paul Fleming) for mezzo-soprano, bass and piano, Op. 76 (1933)*
- Italienische Balladen, Op. 77b (1934)*
- Fünf Lieder (Franz Kafka), Op. 82 (1937/38)
- The night is far spent (text from Paul's epistle to the Romans), Op. 84a (1939)*
- La corona (John Donne) for mezzo-soprano, baritone, organ and percussion, Op. 91 (1941)
  - The Holy Ghost's ark (Donne) for mezzo-soprano, oboe, clarinet, viola and cello, Op. 91a (1941)*
- Die Ballade von den Eisenbahnen (text by the composer), Op. 98 (1944)
- Etüde (text by the composer) for coloratura soprano and alto, Op. 104 (1945)*
- Four songs (Gerard Manley Hopkins), Op. 112 (1946/47)
- Medea (text: German translation of Robinson Jeffers' adaptation in English of Medea by Euripides) for mezzo-soprano and orchestra, Op. 129 (1951)
- Zwei Geistliche Gesänge (text from Ecclesiastes and Psalm 104), Op. 132 (1952)
- Sestina (text by the composer) for soprano and 8 instruments, Op.161 (1957)
- Der Floh (John Donne), Op. 175 (1960)
- Wechselrahmen (Emil Barth), Op. 189 (1964/65)
- Zwischen Erd' und Himmel (Robert Hamerling), WoO 18 (1916)*
- Die vier Lebendigen for tenor, baritone and piano, WoO 86 (193?)*

* unpublished

== Orchestral ==
Symphonies

- Symphony No. 1, Op. 7 (1921)
- Symphony No. 2, Op. 12 (1922)
- Symphony No. 3, Op. 16 (1922)
- Concerto Grosso, Op. 25 (1924)
- Little Symphony, Op. 58 (1928)
- Symphony No. 4, Op. 113 (1947)
- Symphony No. 5, Op. 119 (1949)
- Symphony "Pallas Athene", Op. 137 (1954)
- Horizon Circled, Op. 196 (1967)

Concertos and concertante works

- Violin
  - Violin concerto No. 1, Op. 29 (1924)
  - Violin concerto No. 2, Op. 140 (1954)
- Cello
  - Konzert für Violoncello und Orchester Nr. 1, Op. 133 (1953)
  - Capriccio für Violoncello und Kammerorchester, Op. 145 (1955)
  - Konzert für Violoncello und Orchester Nr. 2, Op. 236 (1982)
- Piano
  - Piano Concerto No. 1 in F-sharp major, Op. 18 (1923)
  - Piano Concerto No. 2, Op. 81 (1937)
  - Piano Concerto No. 3, Op. 107 (1946)
  - Piano Concerto No. 4, Op. 123 (1950)
- Organ
  - Konzert für Orgel und Streichorchester, Op. 230 (1979)
  - Konzert für Orgel und Orchester, Op. 235 (1982)
- Other
  - Concertino for flute, violin, piano, and string orchestra, Op. 27 (1924)
  - Little Concerto for piano or harpsichord, organ, and chamber orchestra, Op. 88 (1940)
  - Double Concerto for violin, piano and small orchestra, Op. 124 (1950)
  - Konzert für Harfe und Kammerorchester, Op. 126 (1951)
  - Exercises of a late hour (in four sections) for violin, viola, cello, double bass, tape and chamber orchestra, Op. 200 (1967)
  - Horn Concerto, WoO 112 (1978)*

Other

- Sieben Orchesterstücke, Op. 31 (1924)
- Ouverture aus "Der Triumph der Empfindsamkeit", Op. 43a (1926)
- Potpourri, Op. 54 (1927)
- Thema und 13 Variationen, Op. 69 (1931)
- I wonder as I wander, Op. 94 (1942)*
- Tricks and Trifles, Op. 101 (1945)
- Symphonic elegy for string orchestra In Memoriam Anton Webern, Op. 105 (1946)
- Static and Ecstatic, Op. 214 (1972)

* unpublished

== Wind band ==
- Symphonie für Blasinstrumente und Schlagwerk, Op. 34 (1925)
- Kleine Blasmusik, Op. 70a (1931)

Marches

- Drei lustige Märsche, Op. 44 (1926)

== Chamber works ==
- Sonate für Violine und Klavier in fis-Moll, Op. 3 (1919)
- Serenade for clarinet and string trio, Op. 4 (1919)
- Streichquartett Nr. 1, Op. 6 (1921)
- Streichquartett Nr. 2, Op. 8 (1921)
- Streichquartett Nr. 3, Op. 20 (1923)
- Streichquartett Nr. 4, Op. 24 (1924)*
- Sonate Nr. 1 für Violine solo, Op. 33 (1925)
- Streichquartett Nr. 5, Op. 65 (1930)
- Vier Bagatellen for piano four hands, Op. 70 (1931)
- Streichquartett Nr. 6, Op. 78 (1936)
- Suite for Violoncello Solo, Op. 84 (1939)
- School music, Op. 85 [a] (1939) (as Thornton Winsloe)**
- Sonatina für Flöte und Viola, Op. 92 No. 2a (1942)
- Sonatina für Flöte und Klarinette, Op. 92 No. 2b (1942)
- Sonate für Viola, Op. 92 No. 3 (1942)
- Streichquartett Nr. 7, Op. 96 (1944)
- Sonata No. 2 for violin and piano, Op. 99 (1945)
- Sonata No. 2 for violin solo, Op. 115 (1948)
- Sonata for viola and piano, Op. 117 (1948)
- Streich Trio, Op. 118 (1946)
- Parvula corona musicalis for string trio, Op. 122 (1950)
- Quintett for wind quintet, Op. 130 (1952)^{†}
- Monologue for clarinet solo, Op. 157 (1956)
- Pentagramm for wind quintet, Op. 163 (1957)
- Suite for guitar, Op. 164 (1957)
- Flötenstück neunphasig for flute and piano, Op. 171 (1959)
- Vier Stücke für Oboe und Klavier, Op. 193 (1966)
- Five Pieces for trombone and piano, Op. 198 (1967)
- Streichquartett Nr. 8, Op. 233 (1980)
- Streichtrio in zwölf Stationen, Op. 237 (1985)
- Opus 239 for horn and organ, Op. 239 (1988)

* unpublished

** Op. 85 is a collection of 10 chamber pieces for various ensembles written under the pseudonymn Thornton Winsloe

† revised as Pentagramm, Op. 163

== Solo ==
Piano

- Double fugue in C major, Op. 1a
- Tanzstudie, Op. 1b
- Sonate für Klavier Nr. 1 in Es-Dur, Op. 2 (1919)
- Sonatinen für Klavier Nr. 1-5, Op. 5 (1920)
- Toccata und Chaconne, Op. 13 (1922)
- Kleine Suite, Op. 13a (1922)
- Zwei Suiten für Klavier, Op. 26 (1924)
- Fünf Klavierstücke, Op. 39 (1925)
- Sonata No. 2, Op. 59
- Twelve Variations in 3 Movements, Op. 79
- Twelve Short Pieces Written in the Twelve-Tone Technique, Op. 83
- Sonate für Klavier Nr. 3, Op. 92 No. 4 (1943)**
- Eight Pieces, Op. 110
- Sonata No. 4, Op. 114
- George Washington Variations, Op. 120
- Sonata No. 5, Op. 121
- Sonata No. 6, Op. 128
- Miniature (Largo), Op. 136
- Twenty Miniatures, Op. 139
- Echoes from Austria, Op. 166
- Six Measurements, Op. 168
- Piano Piece in 11 Parts, Op. 197
- Sonata No. 7, Op. 240
- Unvollendete Klaviersonate in C-Dur von Schubert, WoO 65 (1921)*
- Prelude, WoO 87 (1944)

Organ

- Sonate für Orgel, Op. 92 No. 1 (1941)
- Organologia, Op. 180 1/2 (1962)*
- Zehn Choralvorspiele, Op. 211 (1971)
- Die vier Winde, Op. 223 (1975)

Accordion

- Toccata, Op. 183
- Acco-Musik, Op. 225

* unpublished

**The rest of Op. 92 contains works for other instrumental combinations, including solo viola and solo organ.

== Electronic music ==
- Spiritus Intelligentiae, Sanctus for two voices, speaker and tape, Op. 152 (1956)
- San Fernando Sequence for clarinet, trumpet and tape, Op. 185 (1963)
- Exercises of a late hour (in four sections) for chamber orchestra and tape, Op. 200 (1967)
- Orga-Nastro for organ and tape, Op. 212 (1971), commissioned by and dedicated to Marilyn Mason.
- They knew what they wanted (texts by the composer based on The Decameron, Genesis, Pausanias (?) and Virgil) for speaker, oboe, piano, percussion and tape, Op. 227 (1977)
