= Robert Maggiori =

French-Italian philosopher, translator, and literary critic

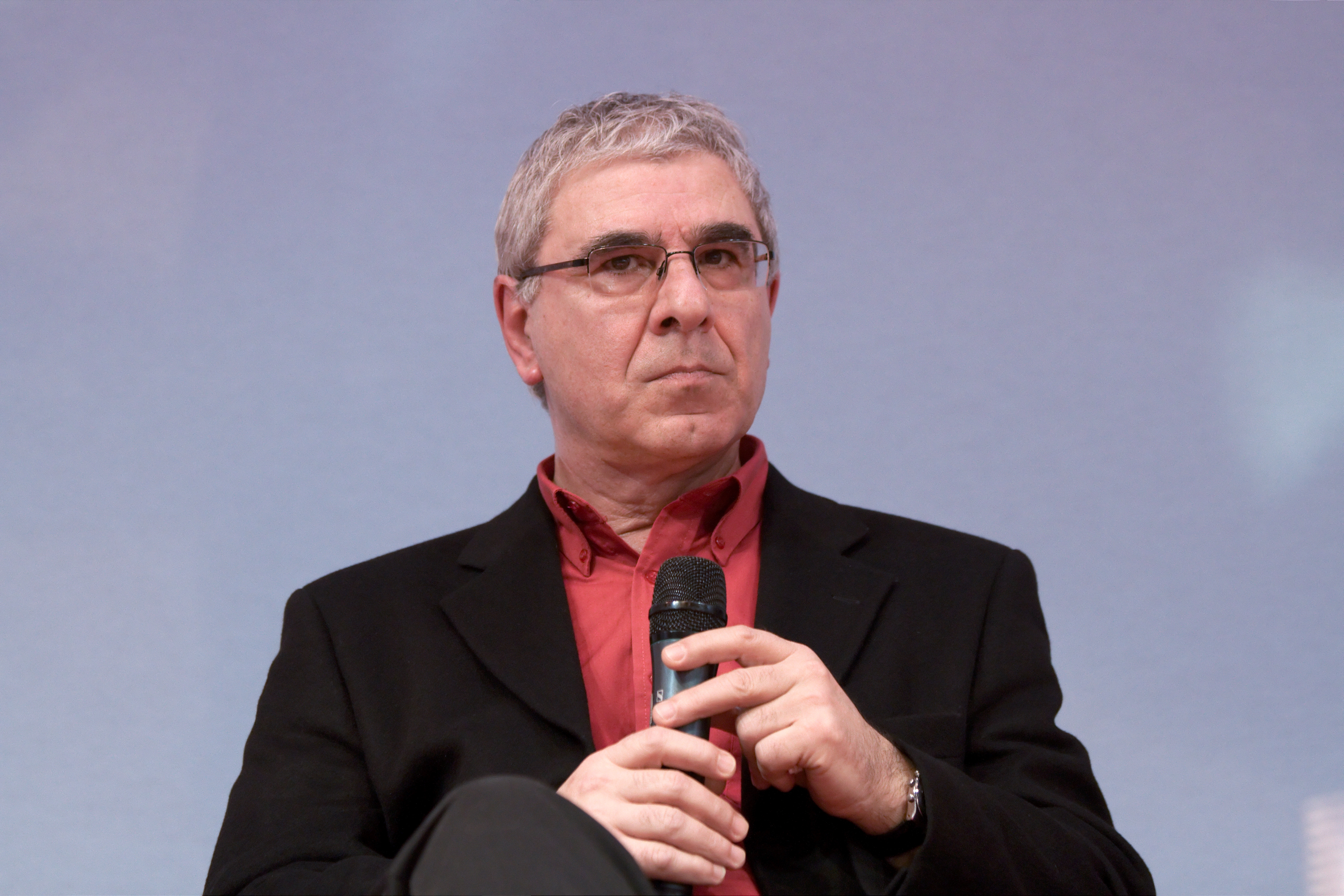
- Born: April 13, 1947 (age 79); Osimo
- Occupations: Philosopher, professor, literary critic, translater
- Relatives: Mark Maggiori (son)

Education
- Education: Lycée Jacques-Amyot, Melun; Paris-Sorbonne University
- Academic advisor: Vladimir Jankélévitch

Philosophical work
- Era: Contemporary Philosophy
- Region: Western Philosophy
- Institutions: PhiloMonaco (rencontres/awards); Libération (newspaper)
- Notable students: Charlotte Casiraghi
- Main interests: History of philosophy, Italian philosophy, moral philosophy, political science, public philosophy

Robert Maggiori, born 13 April 1947 in Osimo, is a journalist, literary critic, translator (Italian to French), and philosopher in France.

== Biography & education ==
He completed secondary schooling at Lycée Jacques-Amyot in Melun (Seine-et-Marne), then enrolled at La Sorbonne, where he pursued (but did not finish) a doctorate under the direction of Vladimir Jankélévitch.

Initially appointed to teach at the Lycée André-Malraux in Montereau-Fault-Yonne, then to the Lycée Uruguay-France d'Avon, Seine-et-Marne, in the same department, he began to teach philosophy at the Lycée François-Couperin in Fontainebleau in 1985.

== Career ==
Robert Maggiori is also a journalist at Libération, where he has published literary and philosophical criticism for nearly thirty years. One well-known piece in Libération is an interview of Jacques Derrida by Maggiori on the issue of multiple choice testing. Moreover, in one of his lectures for Rencontres Philosophiques, he referenced an interview of his mentor, Vladimir Jankélévitch, for the newspaper, shortly before the latter's death in 1985.

He contributes to numerous journals (La Pensée, Alfabeta, Le Magazine littéraire, Critique, Les Temps modernes, etc.) and translates Italian works in the humanities. He was a member of the editorial board of Critique and co-director (with Christian Descamps) of the Itinéraires collection at Éditions Flammarion, and later of the collection Philosophie présente, Chez Bordas.

He has translated several works (on political science, phenomenology, anthropology, philosophy, and psychiatry) from Italian into French.

He is a member of l'Institut de la pensée contemporaine (Institute of Contemporary Thought) at Paris Diderot University.

Along with Charlotte Casiraghi, (Note: Casiraghi was his student at Lycée François Couperin de Fontainebleau. She was in his Terminale class. See interview in reference, 1:05.) Joseph Cohen, and Raphaël Zagury-Orly, he is a founding member of Les Rencontres Philosophiques de Monaco. He is the President of the Jury for the prizes presented annually by the organization also called, for short, PhiloMonaco.

== Distinctions ==
- Chevalier, Ordre des Palmes académiques

== Personal life ==
He is the father of three adult children, including the French-American artist Mark Maggiori.

== Published works ==
Authors listed only in the case of multiple authors; otherwise the work is by Robert Maggiori alone.

=== Books ===
- Grisoni, Dominique and Maggiori, Robert. Lire Gramsci. Éditions universitaires, 1973. Also published later in Les temps moderne, No 343, February 1975, pp. 879-1062. Digitized on 6 October 2006. (Note: Preface by Chatelet de François and Maria Antonietta MacCiocchi. 280 pages; Description: 280 p. ; 20 cm. Subjects: Gramsci, Antonio, 1891-1937. Series: Citoyens, 4. 3 Kg.)
- "De la convivance: philosophie de la liberté ou philosophie de l'amour?." Éditions Fayard, 1985. ISBN 9782213014302.
- De la Convivance, Editions Fayard, 1986. ISBN 9782213014302.
- "La philosophie au jour le jour." Éditions Flammarion, 1994). ISBN 9782080669155.
- Un animal, un philosophe, Éditions Julliard, 2005. ISBN 2260016863.
- À la rencontre des philosophes: 100 chroniques de Libération, Bordas, 2005. ISBN 9782047320631.
- Le métier de critique - Journalisme et philosophie, Éditions du Seuil, 2011. ISBN 9782020988001.
- Maggiori, Robert and Casiraghi, Charlotte. Archipel des Passions. Éditions du Seuil. 2018. ISBN 9782021335750.
- Mémoire. De Sartre à Bruno Latour. Vies et morts de philosophes contemporains. ISBN 9782711631308. Librairie philosophique J. Vrin, 2023.

=== Periodical works ===
- Delacampagne, Christian and Maggiori, Robert, dir., Philosopher. Les interrogations contemporaines, Matériaux pour un enseignement. Reviewed by Maryvonne Roth - 1981 - Philosophy in Review 1 (5):202-206. Republished in later collections. See section on editorial works.
- Contat, Michel and Maggiori, Robert. Obituary of Simone de Beauvoir. Radical Philosophy O44. Autumn 1986.
- "Can a Critic be Philosophical?". Le Débat, 1992/5 No 72, 1992. p.231-236.
- “Philosophy through the Looking Glass.” World Press Review 42 (5): 44. (1995).
- Etre ou avoir, une question de Fromm. Libération, Paris 19. October 2000, p. XI.
- Ost in Translation - 5 June 2009. Originally published in Libération, then republished at the link in VoxEurop. (English)

=== Prefaces ===
- Vladimir Jankélévitch filosofo dell'amore, preface to the Italian edition of Traité des Vertus, rendered as Trattato delle virtù, and translated by E. Klersy Imberciadori. Milan: Garzanti, 1987. Second edition 1996. 304p. ISBN 9788811674559. Out of print.

=== Translations ===
From Italian to French

- Notes sur Gramsci, by Alfonso Leonetti, EDI, Paris, 1974
- Pour le communisme : questions de théorie, by Nicola Badaloni, Mouton, La Haye, 1975
- Analyse en famille, by Maria Marcone, Éditions Payot, Paris, 1979
- L'Enfant poisson, by Michele Zappella, Paris, Payot, 1979
- La Mauvaise mère - Phénoménologie et anthropologie de l'infanticide, by Glauco Carloni and Daniela Nobili, Payot, 1977
- Sexualité et culture, by Franco Fornari, PUF, 1978
- Qu'est-ce que la psychiatrie ?, by Franco Basaglia, PUF, 1980

=== Works cited in ===
- Mythologies du porc, cited in the bibliography for Walter, Philippe: Le Courrier de l'environnement de l'INRA 37, no. 37 (1999): 103-105.
- Hottois, Gilbert, Christian Delacampagne, and Robert Maggiori. "Travail et technoscience." (2000). Cited in Silverstein, Marc. (ed.) Matériaux scientifiques et philosophiques pour un matérialisme contemporain. Éditions Matériologiques, 2013.

== Editorial work ==
- Collection Itinéraires, Éditions Flammarion
- Collection Philosophie Présente, Chez Bordas (co-edited with Christian Delacampagne)
  - Philosopher. 2014. Éditions Robert Laffont, 2014. Collection Bouquins. ISBN 9782221138496.
  - Philosopher: les interrogations contemporaines : matériaux pour un enseignement. Éditions Fayard, 2000. ISBN 9782213606415.
- Special issues in the revue Critique, (Éditions de Minuit)
  - Les philosophes italiens par eux-mêmes, N° 452-53, (1985)
  - Michel Foucault, du monde entier, N° 471-72, (1986). ISBN 9782707310897.
  - Vladimir Jankélévitch, N° 500-01, (1989)
  - Giacomo Leopardi, N° 512-13, (1990). ISBN 9782707313249

== Television ==
- Carlo Ginzburg, Réflexions faites, GMT Productions, La Sept/Arte
- Ernst Gombrich, Réflexions faites, GMT Productions, La Sept/Arte (in collaboration with Didier Eribon)
- Philosophy Masterclass for Libération (DVD, Éditions Montparnasse) :
  - L’Amour (with André Comte-Sponville, Anne Dufourmantelle, Michel Erman and Nicolas Grimaldi)
  - La Famille (with Elisabeth Roudinesco, Luc Ferry, François de Singly and Irène Théry)
  - Dieu (with Rémi Brague, Julia Kristeva, Jean-Luc-Marion and Michel Serres).
- La Grande Librairie, « Archipel des passions » : la rencontre philosophique de Charlotte Casiraghi et Robert Maggiori. 23 February 2018. France Televisions: France 5.

== Podcasts ==
- PhiloMonaco podcast: La Maison de la Philosophie/Leçons de Philosophie 2018
  - Robert Maggiori // Jankélévitch et l'amour - Uploaded 27 December 2018
  - Robert Maggiori // Philosophie Et Sport - Aired 10 May 2019 / uploaded 26 August 2019
