= Critique (French journal) =

- Discipline: Philosophy
- Language: French

Publication details
- History: 1946–present
- Publisher: Les Éditions de Minuit
- Frequency: monthly

Standard abbreviations
- ISO 4: Critique (Paris)

Indexing
- ISSN: 0011-1600 (print); 1968-3901 (web)

Links
- Journal homepage

Critique is a monthly literary, philosophical and artistic journal established in 1946 by Georges Bataille. Originally published by Editions du Chêne, it has been published since 1950 by Les Éditions de Minuit.

== Notable issues ==
- Special issues edited by Robert Maggiori in the revue Critique:
  - Les philosophes italiens par eux-mêmes, N° 452-53, (1985)
  - Michel Foucault, du monde entier, N° 471-72, (1986). ISBN 9782707310897.
  - Vladimir Jankélévitch, N° 500-01, (1989).
  - Giacomo Leopardi, N° 512-13, (1990). ISBN 9782707313249.

== Editors ==
- Jean Piel from 1962-1996
- Philippe Roger (present)

== Editorial board ==
- Marc Augé
- Françoise Balibar
- Pierre Birnbaum
- Antoine Compagnon
- Danièle Cohn
- Pedro Cordoba
- Élie During
- Yves Hersant
- Alain de Libera
