= Rood screen of Strasbourg Cathedral =

13th century monument in Strasbourg Cathedral

- Jubé de la cathédrale de Strasbourg
- Reconstruction of the rood screen at the Musée de l’Œuvre Notre-Dame.
- Current location of the reconstructed rood screen
- Location: Strasbourg Cathedral (original) Musée de l'Œuvre Notre-Dame (restored) Strasbourg. France
- Coordinates: 48°34′50.48684″N 7°45′3.48559″E
- Type: Rood screen
- Completion date: Between 1260 and 1270
- Restored date: 19th century onwards
- Dismantled date: 1682

The rood screen of Strasbourg Cathedral is a partially-recovered 13th-century gothic monument meant to separate the choir from the nave in the cathedral. Built in the 13th century, It was demolished in 1682, when the Cathedral changed from Protestantism to Catholicism and adopted the ideas of counter-reformation, which prohibited this type of architecture. Fragments of its statuary were later rediscovered between the 19th and 20th centuries, making it possible to reconstruct the two bays of the rood screen in the late 1930s. It has been on display at the Musée de l'Œuvre Notre-Dame ever since.

Throughout history, written descriptions and illustrations of the rood screen have survived, providing insight into its iconography and later aiding in its restoration. Sharing a similar style to that of Notre-Dame Cathedral in Reims, the rood screen featured, different Christian figures. On the half facing the nave, the rood screen inscribed statues of the 12 Apostles and evangelists, as well as depictions of the works of mercy and the Last Judgment. On the choir side, the wall was adorned with scenes depicting the Old Testament, and two staircases provided access to the work.

== History ==
=== Role ===
Plan of the Strasbourg Cathedral in 1643, as illustrated by Johann Jakob Arhardt. The rood screen appears in the center, between the nave and the choir.

In the Middle Ages, a rood screen was an enclosed gallery that separated the space between a congregation - the nave, and the church's bishop and canons - the choir. In addition to their role as separators, rood screens provided the preacher with an elevated place, from which they can preach and read the Bible to the congregation below.

As designed in the Strasbourg Cathedral and contributing to the cathedral's iconography and aesthetics, the rood screen included designs that depict the Twelve Apostles as faithful, thus emphasizing the role of the Church. Architecturally, it separated the two styles present in the cathedral: Romanesque, and Gothic, and it obscured the lower parts of the Western piers of the transept. Unlike other rood screens in France, this rood screen featured a heavy balustrade and a single central doorway, resembling a Germanic variant.

=== Construction and dating ===
Details about when the rood screen was built, and who oversaw the building process remain unclear, relating to a center of debates about the date of the nave's construction, since its existence assumed that the piers supporting it were constructed beforehand. Another factor was when the western façade of Reims Cathedral was built, as the rood screen was inspired by the façade. Moreover, Swiss historian Hans Reinhardt noted that - based on illustrations of the rood screen's engravings and statues - the nave is both structurally and stylistically linked to the rood screen.

The first mention of the Strasbourg Cathedral rood screen was written on a complaint by Bishop Walter de Geroldseck against the city council of Strasbourg in 1261, which had claimed about the rights to "grant sanctuary" under the rood screen.

==== Nave and façade ====
Art historian Peter Kurmann suggested that the rood screen was first constructed in the Romanesque style, as part of the church's reform to have similar characteristics with those of the Holy Roman Empire in the late 12th and early 13th centuries. Because of such dating, Kurmann notes that this initial rood screen was constructed "well before 1260".

When modifications were made to introduce the Gothic style to the rood screen, it was drawn upon the style of Reims Cathedral. More specifically, the style comes from its western façade, helping researchers to narrow down the earliest possible date the rood screen would've been built.

Peter Kurmann demonstrated that, based on a vidimus, or copy of a legal document, from April 1252, the construction of the façade had not yet begun until 1255; therefore, he dates the new rood screen to have been finished around 1260. Similarly, art historian Willibald Sauerländer estimated that the construction of the façade took place around 1250, then the Strasbourg rood screen around 1261. However, historian Jean Wirth argues that Kurmann's conclusion is false; as the vidimus did not prove that the construction actually begin in 1252, and combined with marking phases on the façade similar to those found in predating sculptures in Strasbourg Cathedral, the façade must've begun construction in the period roughly between 1247 and 1252. aligning with Reinhardt's chronology of the nave's construction, which claims that it started in around 1235-1240.

To better account for the period when French architects began developing a new variant of Gothic, architecture historian Yves Gallet proposed that the nave started construction between 1245 and 1250 instead, with it being interrupted due to a dispute with the cathedral's bishops, Henri III of Stahleck and later Walter of Geroldseck. Following the Battle of Hausbergen and the election of Henri IV de Geroldseck, the construction was resumed in 1263. According to hypothesis, which aligns with Kurmann's dating, the proceeding construction of the rood screen begun at earliest between 1255 and 1260, and at latest between 1265 and 1270.

==== Master builder ====
Regarding the master builder, or the official overseeing the construction process, several hypotheses have been put forward. Historian Georges Delahache attributes the rood screen to Werlinus of Nordelahe, whose name was found on a 13th-century inscription in the cloister, (Note: The inscription says Hic jacet Magister Werlinus de Nordelahe,, meaning "Here lies Master Welinus of Nordelahe") and can be compared to Master Wernlinus mentioned in a register dating from 1257. As early as 1777, authorship of the rood screen and the Pillar of Angels was attributed to Erwin of Steinbach, although he was born around 1244. According to hiostorian Hans Haug, the iconography of the rood screen was conceived by Albert the Great.

=== Demolition ===
By the end of the Middle Ages, rood screens acted as a visual obstacle, meaning that congregations participating in eucharist and other liturgical activities only through hearing and smell. Seen as an act of exclusion, it led to demands banning such practices by the Council of Trent, hence resulting in the Catholic Church banning rood screens across European churches in the mid-16th century. Between 1520 and 1529, the city of Strasbourg converted to Lutheranism, thus escaping the imposed ban. However, in 1681, Strasbourg was incorporated into the Kingdom of France under the conquest of King Louis XIV, and the cathedral was re-converted back into Catholicism. The following year, the rood screen was destroyed.

=== Recovery ===
Room in the Musée de l'Œuvre Notre-Dame containing the bays of the rood screen.

The first elements of the rood screen were rediscovered between 1843 and 1853, during renovation works in the choir. French architect Gustave Klotz discovered fragments of the rood screen's architecture and sculptures by lowering the floor level, which had been raised in the 17th century by Jean Georges Heckler. In 1893, German architect Johann Knauth found 10 statues in the pinnacle of the staircases of the cathedral's octagonal tower, and using 17th-century copper engravings by Isaac Brunn, he attributed these statues to the rood screen.
