= Zappella =

Zappella is an Italian surname. Notable people with the surname include:

- Davide Zappella (born 1998), Italian footballer
- Giuseppe Zappella (born 1973), Italian footballer
- Michele Zappella (born 1936), Italian psychiatrist and scholar
