= Anne Dufourmantelle =

French psychoanalyst and philosopher (1964–2017)

- Born: 20 March 1964; Paris, France
- Died: 21 July 2017 (aged 53); Ramatuelle, France
- Education: Paris-Sorbonne University; Brown University
- Occupations: Philosopher, psychoanalyst
- Spouse: Frédéric Boyer

Anne Dufourmantelle (20 March 1964 – 21 July 2017) was a French philosopher and psychoanalyst.

== Education and career ==
Dufourmantelle was educated at Brown University and at Paris-Sorbonne University, where she earned a doctorate in philosophy in 1994. She practised psychoanalysis and was a professor at the European Graduate School and a contributor to the French daily newspaper Libération.

Her philosophical work focused on risk taking, which she argued was essential, saying that "absolute security - like 'zero risk' - is a fantasy". Her book Éloge du risque or Praise of Risk was published in 2011. Dufourmantelle was also a professor of psychoanalysis at The European Graduate School.

== Personal life and death ==
Her partner was Frédéric Boyer and she had three children. Her daughter is French singer-songwriter and composer, Clara Yse. Yse's debut EP, Le Monde S’Est Dédoublé, released in 2019, was written about Dufourmantelle's death.

She died on July 21, 2017, at Pampelonne beach in Ramatuelle near the city of Saint-Tropez, while trying to rescue two children caught in the Mediterranean when the water became dangerously turbulent. The children were rescued by lifeguards and survived, but Dufourmantelle could not be resuscitated.

== Honours ==
Dufourmantelle won the Prix Raymond de Boyer de Sainte-Suzanne from the Académie française in 1998.

== Works ==
- De l'hospitalité, with Jacques Derrida, Paris, Calmann-Lévy, 1997 ISBN 978-2-7021-2795-7
- La Vocation prophétique de la philosophie, Éditions du Cerf, 1998
- La Sauvagerie maternelle, Paris, Calmann-Lévy, 2001, édition poche 2016 ISBN 978-2743636579
- Le Livre de Jonas, with Marc-Alain Ouaknin, Bayard, 2001
- Parcours : entretiens avec Anne Dufourmantelle, with Miguel Benasayag, Paris, Amazon Media, 2001
- Une question d'enfant, Paris, Bayard, 2002 ISBN 978-2-2270-1103-8
- Blind Date : sexe et philosophie, Paris, Calmann-Lévy, 2003 ISBN 978-2-7021-3402-3
- Du retour : abécédaire biopolitique, A.Pandolfi, 2003
- Negri on Negri : in conversation, Taylor & Francis, 2004 ISBN 978-0-4159-6895-9
- Procès Dutroux : penser l'émotion, Paris, ministère de la Communauté française, 2004
- American Philo, with Avital Ronell, Paris, éditions Stock, 2006 ISBN 2-234-05840-6 BnF 40227131g
- La Femme et le Sacrifice : d'Antigone à la femme d'à côté, Paris, Denoël, 2007 ISBN 978-2-2072-5412-7
- Fighting theory, with Avital Ronell, Université de l'Illinois Press, 2010 ISBN 978-0-2520-7623-7
- Éloge du risque, Paris, Payot, 2011 ISBN 978-2-2289-0642-5
- Dieu, l'amour et la psychanalyse, with Jean-Pierre Winter, Paris, Bayard Jeunesse, 2011 ISBN 978-2-2274-7232-7
- Intelligence du rêve, Paris, Payot, 2012 ISBN 978-2-2289-0736-1
- En cas d'amour : psychopathologie de la vie amoureuse, Paris, Rivages, 2012 ISBN 978-2-7436-2305-0;
- Puissance de la douceur, Paris, Payot, 2013 ISBN 978-2-2289-0964-8
- Se trouver, with Laure Leter, Paris, Jean-Claude Lattès, 2014 ISBN 978-2-7096-3690-2
- L'Envers du feu, Paris, éditions Albin Michel, 2015 ISBN 978-2-226-31807-7
- Défense du secret, Éditions Payot, 2015

== Television ==
- Philosophy Masterclass for Libération (DVD, Éditions Montparnasse) : L’Amour (with André Comte-Sponville, Robert Maggiori, Michel Erman and Nicolas Grimaldi)
