= Alda Merini =

Italian writer and poet (1931–2009)

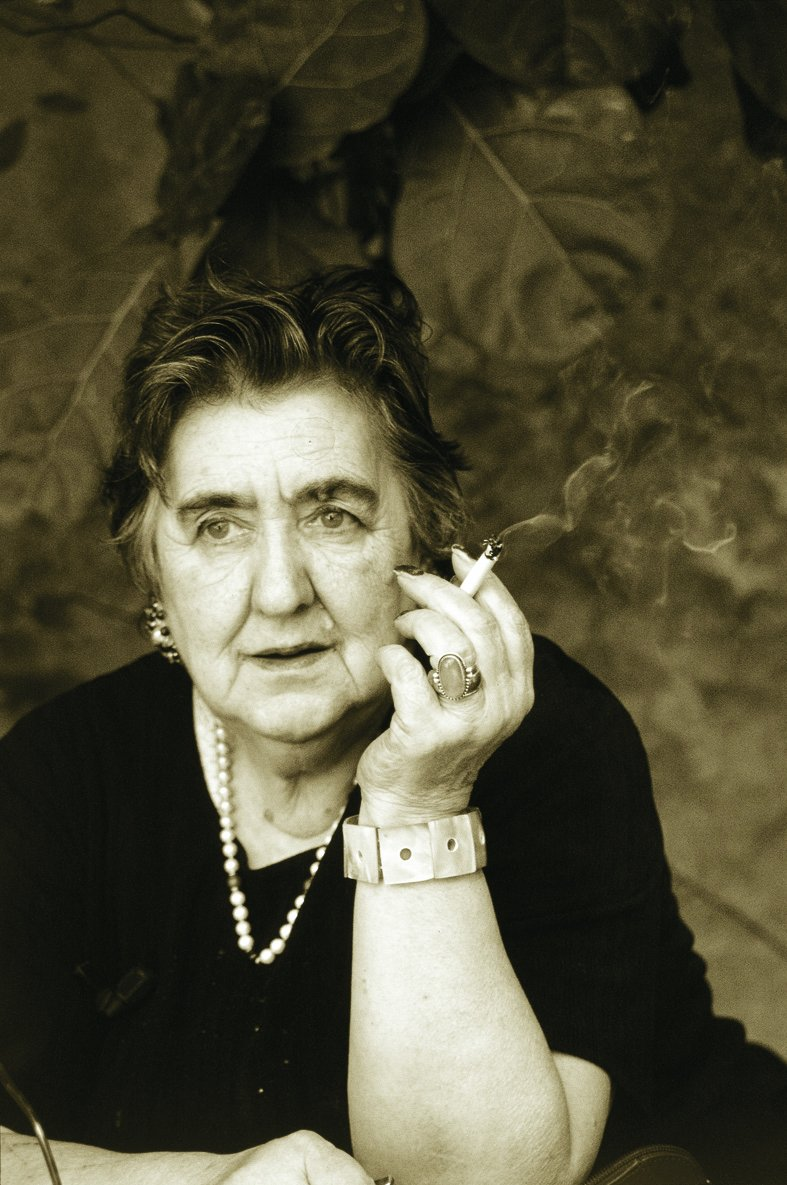
- Born: 21 March 1931; Milan, Italy
- Died: 1 November 2009 (aged 78); Milan, Italy
- Resting place: Monumental Cemetery of Milan
- Occupations: writer, poet
- Writing career
- Language: Italian
- Years active: 1953–2008
- Notable awards: Viareggio Prize, Premio Dessì

Alda Merini (21 March 1931 – 1 November 2009) was an Italian writer and poet. Her work earned the attention and admiration of other Italian writers, such as Giorgio Manganelli, Salvatore Quasimodo, and Pier Paolo Pasolini.

Merini's writing style has been described as intense, passionate and mystic, and it is influenced by Rainer Maria Rilke. Some of her most dramatic poems concern her time in a mental health institution (from 1964 to 1970). Her 1986 poem The Other Truth. Diary of a Misfit (L'altra verità. Diario di una diversa) is considered one of her masterpieces.

In 1996 she was nominated by the Académie Française as a candidate for the Nobel Prize in Literature. In 2002 she was made Dame of the Republic. In 2007 she won the Elsa Morante Ragazzi Award with Alda e Io – Favole (Alda and Me: Fairytales), a poem written in cooperation with the fable author Sabatino Scia. In the same year, she received an honorary degree in Theory of Communication and Languages at the University of Messina. At the time of her death, President of the Italian Republic Giorgio Napolitano described her as an "inspired and limpid poetic voice".

== Early years and education ==
Alda Giuseppina Angela Merini was born on 21 March 1931 in viale Papiniano 57, Milan in a family of modest means. Her father, Nemo Merini, was an employee working at the insurance company "Vecchia Mutua Grandine ed Eguaglianza il Duomo". Her mother, Emilia Painelli, was a housewife. Alda was the second daughter of three children, including Anna (born on 26 November 1926), and Ezio (born in January 1943). Her siblings are featured in her poems, albeit thinly disguised. Little is known about her childhood, other than what she wrote in the short autobiographical notes on the occasion of the second edition of the Spagnoletti Anthology: "[I was] a sensitive girl, with a rather melancholic character, quite excluded and little understood by my parents but very good in school ... because studying has always been a vital part of my life".

After graduating from primary school with very high marks, she attended the three-year school-to-work transition programme at the Istituto Laura Solera Mantegazza in via Ariberto in Milan, while trying to be admitted to Liceo Manzoni. However, she did not succeed, as she did not pass the Italian language test. In the same period, she took piano lessons, an instrument she especially loved. At the age of fifteen, she wrote her first poem. Her school teacher, impressed, brought it to the attention of literary critic Giacinto Spagnoletti, who replied with an enthusiastic critique. When Merini showed Spagnoletti's letter to her father, he tore it apart, declaring that "poetry will never feed you" The experience caused a breakdown, and in 1947 Merini spent a month in the mental health clinic Villa Turro in Milan. After being discharged, her friend Giorgio Manganelli, whom she had met at the house of Spagnoletti together with Luciano Erba and David Maria Turoldo, tried to help her by recommending her to the psychoanalysts Franco Fornari and Cesare Musatti.

== Career ==
In 1950, Giacinto Spagnoletti published Merini's work for the first time in Antologia della poesia italiana contemporanea 1909–1949 (Anthology of Contemporary Italian Poetry 1909–1949). The selected works were the lyric poems Il gobbo (The Hunch), dated 22 December 1948, and Luce (Light), dated 22 December 1949 and dedicated to Spagnoletti. In 1951, at the suggestion of Eugenio Montale and Maria Luisa Spaziani, the publisher Giovanni Scheiwiller published two of Merini's previously unpublished poems in Poetesse del Novecento (Women Poets from 1900). From 1950 to 1953 Merini developed a professional connection and close friendship with Salvatore Quasimodo. Following a brief relationship with Giorgio Manganelli, on 9 August 1953 she married Ettore Carniti, a bakery owner from Milan. The same year Arturo Schwarz published her first volume of poems entitled La presenza di Orfeo (The Presence of Orpheus). In 1955 she published her second collection of poems, Paura di Dio (Fear of God). It included poems written between 1947 and 1953. It was followed in 1954 by Nozze romane (Roman Wedding) and, in the same year, Bompiani published the prose work La pazza della porta accanto (The Mad Woman from Next Door).

In 1955, she gave birth to her first daughter, Emanuela. Merini dedicated the collection of poems Tu sei Pietro (You are Pietro), published by Scheiwiller in 1962, to Pietro De Pascale, the doctor who took care of her child. Merini's pregnancy was followed by a bout of depression, and she spent a period of time in isolation until she was sent to the mental health clinic Paolo Pini. Merini divided her time between her home and the clinic until 1972. She had three more daughters, Flavia, Barbara and Simona, who ended up being raised in foster families due to Merini's fragile mental health.

=== Terra Santa ===
In 1979, Merini started putting together a particularly intense body of work based on her experience at the psychiatric ward. On 7 July 1983 her husband suddenly died and Merini, without any support from the literary community, worked hard to get more of her poems published to support herself and her family but to no avail. However, in 1982, Paolo Mauri, had offered to publish thirty of her poems, chosen from a typewritten document of about one hundred, in his journal (n. 4, Winter 1982-Spring 1983). In 1984 Scheiwiller republished Merini's forty poems in the collection Terra Santa (Holy Land). Maria Corti called the book "a masterpiece", and Merini went on to win the Librex Montale Prize.

During that time, Merini started a relationship with the poet Michele Pierri, who had been very supportive of her poems during a very difficult time. In October 1983 Alda and Michele got married and moved to Taranto. In the time following her wedding, she wrote twenty poems-portraits called La gazza ladra (The Thieving Magpie), later to be released in the volume Vuoto d'amore (Empty Love), together with some works by Pierri. During her time in Taranto, she also finished L'altra verità. Diario di una diversa (The Other Truth. Diary of a Misfit).

=== L'altra verità. Diario di una diversa ===
"I couldn't have written anything about the flowers in that moment because I myself had become a flower, I myself had a stem and I myself produced sap." - Alda Merini, from L'altra verità. Diario di una diversa

In July 1986, after a brief spell in the psychiatric hospital in Taranto, Merini moved back to Milan and initiated a therapy cycle with the doctor Marcella Rizzo, to whom she dedicated more than a poem. In the same year she started writing again and got newly in touch with Vanni Scheiwiller, who published L'altra verità. Diario di una diversa, her first book written in prose that, as Giorgio Manganelli stated in the preface, "it is neither a document nor a testimony on the ten years spent by the writer in a mental institution. It is a 'reconnaissance' through epiphanies, deliria, tunes, songs, revelations and apparitions, of a space - not a place - where, failing every habit and everyday perspicacity, the natural hell and the numinuous nature of human being burts out." The book was followed by Fogli bianchi (White sheets of paper, 1987), La volpe e il sipario (The Fox and the Curtain, 1997) and Testamento (Testament, 1988). In 1987 she was a finalist for the literary prize Premio Bergamo.

=== Caffè sui Navigli ===
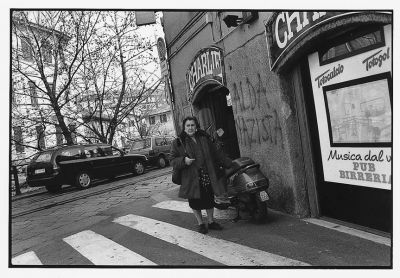
Alda Merini on the way to Caffé Chimera in Milan, c. 1990

Merini's years in Milan were very productive. During the winter of 1989, she started spending time at the cafe/bookshop Chimera, not far from where she lived, offering typewritten poems to her friends. Chimera proved to be a particularly inspirational setting, and it was there that Merini wrote her next two books, Delirio amoroso (Love Delirium, 1989) and Il tormento delle figure (The Figure's Torment, 1990). In 1991 she published Le parole di Alda Merini (The Words of Alda Merini) and Vuoto d'amore (Empty Love). These were followed by Ipotenusa d'amore (Hypothene of Love, 1992), La palude di Manganelli o il monarca del re (The Manganelli Swamp or the King's Monarch, 1993), Aforismi (Aphorisms, with photographs by Giuliano Grittini, 1993) and Titano amori intorno (Titan's Loves Around, 1993). In 1993 she won the Premio Librex Montale for poetry. The prize significantly elevated her status within the Italian literary community, and Merini was rated together with writers such as Giorgio Caproni, Attilio Bertolucci, Mario Luzi, Andrea Zanzotto and Franco Fortini. In 2007 Alda e Io – Favole, written in collaboration with the fable writer Sabatino Scia, won the Elsa Morante Ragazzi prize. On 17 October 2007, Merini received an honorary degree in Theory of Communication and Language at the School of Educational Sciences at the University of Messina, giving a lectio magistralis on the meandering twists and turns of events that constituted her life.

=== Reato di vita: Autobiografia e poesia ===
In 1994, Merini's collection of poems Sogno e Poesia (Dream and Poetry) was published as a special limited edition featuring engravings by twenty contemporary artists. It was followed by Reato di vita: Autobiografia e poesia (Life Crime: Autobiography and Poetry) published by Edizioni Melusine. In 1995 she published La Pazza della porta accanto (The Mad Woman from Next Door) with Bompiani and Ballate non pagate (Unpaid Dances) with Einaudi. The same year Apulian musician Vincenzo Mastropirro put to music some of Merini's verses from Ballate. In 1996 she received the Viareggio Prize for the volume La Vita Facile (The Easy Life). She also put together a small publication for La Vita Felice publishing house made of old and new poems, a confessional diary, a selection of short stories and an interview entitled Un'anima indocile (A Restless Soul). In the same year, Merini met the artist Giovanni Bonaldi with whom she formed a genuine and strong friendship. They began to collaborate and in 1997 Girardi published the collection of poems La volpe e il sipario (The Fox and the Curtain) with illustrations by Gianni Casari. This collection evidences the technical finesse of Merini's improvisational poetry which others sought to emulate. This development in her work led to the composition of shorter texts and simple aphorisms. In November of the same year, Ariete published Curva di fuga (The Vanishing Curve), which Merini presented at Castello Sforzesco in Soncino, where she was presented with honorary citizenship. In 1997 Bonaldi drew five illustrations for a collection of poems and epigrams of Merini entitled Salmi della gelosia (Psalms of Jealousy), published by Ariete. The same year she was awarded the Procida Prize.

=== Alda Merini: una donna sul palcoscenico ===
In 2009, the documentary Alda Merini: una donna sul palcoscenico (Alda Merini: A Woman on Stage) directed by Cosimo Damiano Damato, was presented on Author's Day at the 66th Venice Film Festival. The film, produced by Angelo Tumminelli for Star Dust International, included portions of Merini's poems read by Mariangela Melato, with cinematography by Giuliano Grittini. Merini and Damato became great friends during the filming and Merini gave him unpublished poems to include in the film. Merini wrote a poem, "Una donna sul palcoscenico," specifically for the purpose of including it in the film:

One day I lost words/ I came here to tell you this and not because you responded/ I don't love conversations or questions: I noticed that I once sang in a voiceless choir/ I meditated a long time on the silence, and to silence there is no response./ I threw away my poems/ I didn't have paper to write them on./ Then I noticed that strange animals like ancestral beasts in the form of men from asylums were coming close to me/ some of them helped me feel unique, looked at me. / For them, I thought, there were no stoplights, buildings, streets./ This ramshackle place, my mind has found solitude./ Then a saint with something to give arrived/ a saint that was not chained, that was not an evildoer,/ the one thing that I had had during all these years./ I would have followed him / but I forgot how to fall in love./ He came, a saint that illuminated me like a star./ A saint responded to me: why don't you love yourself? My indolence was born./ I no longer see people that hit me, and I no longer visit the nuthouse./ I have died in indolence.

The film received positive reviews. Roberta Bottari wrote in Il Messaggero: "With a voice that betrays her childlike candor, a smile that illuminates her eyes and the unmistakable fire-red lipstick, Alda Merini abandoned herself to Cosimo Damato. She trusts him, she 'feels' that she will not be betrayed. And while the director stands with the still camera, waiting for a look, a twitch, a word from the woman, she seduces him speaking of poetry, mysticism, philosophy, music, of foolishness poured out in verse, of Christ and passion, without censuring family pain and the experience of the asylum."

== Death ==
Alda Merini died in Milan on 1 November 2009, following a brief illness. She is interred in the Monumental Cemetery of Milan.

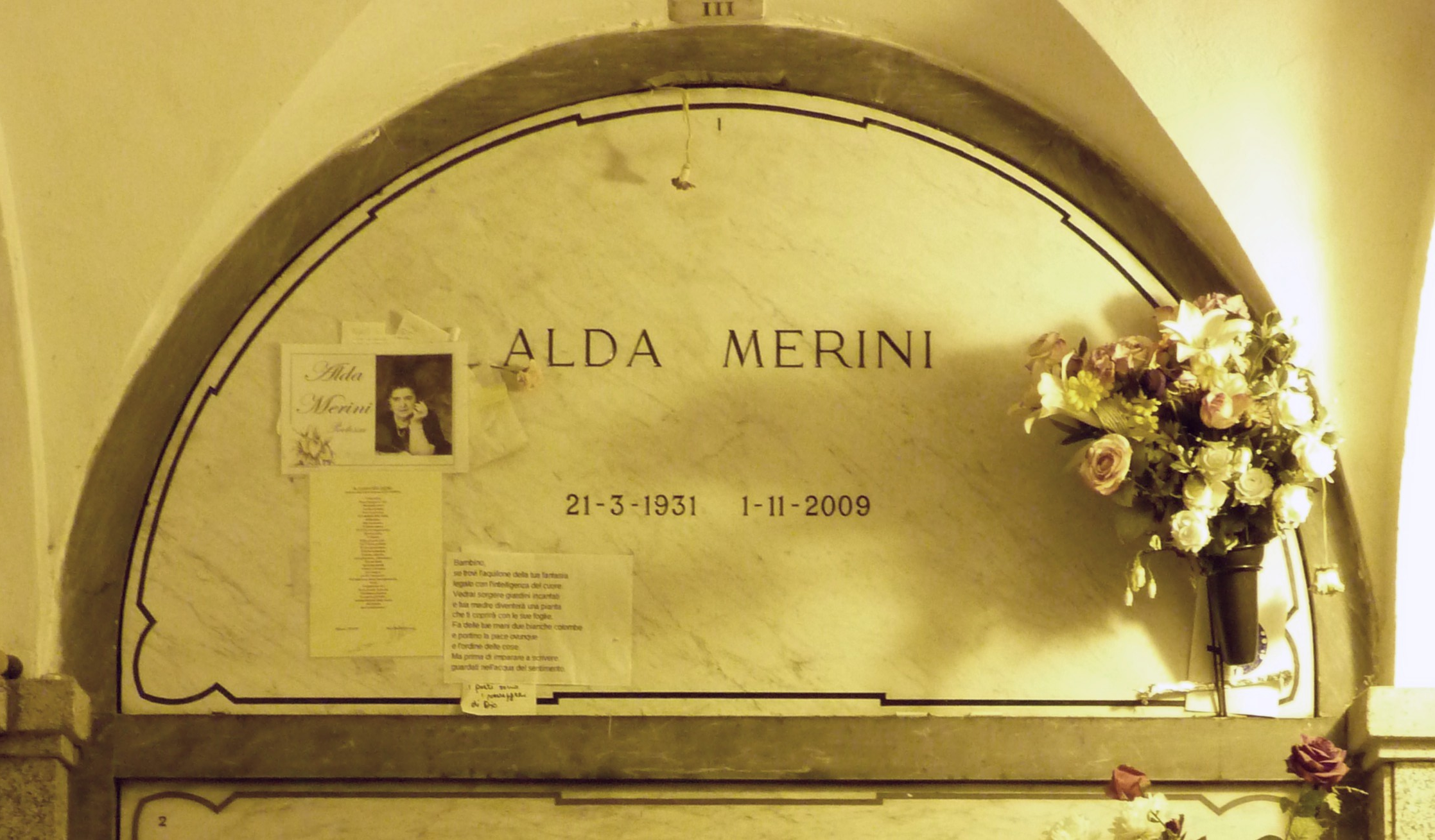
Alda Merini's grave at the Monumental Cemetery of Milan in 2015

== Selected bibliography ==
- A Rage of Love, Guernica (1996)
- Unpaid Ballad, Dante University Press (2001)
- The Holy Land, Guernica (2001)
- Colpe di immagini, Rizzoli (2007) (with photos)
- Love Lessons: Selected Poems of Alda Merini, Facing Pages (2009)

== Music ==
- Canto di spine: versi italiani del '900 in forma canzone, an album by Italian band Altera. Merini plays the theme from Johnny Guitar on piano and sings her poem "Il canto".
- Milva canta Merini, an album by Italian singer Milva with lyrics by Merini and music by Giovanni Nuti (2004)
- Dio, a composition by Francesco Trocchia for female choir and piano with lyrics by Merini (2007)

== Tribute ==
Merini was honoured with a street in the Milanese suburb of Rozzano. On 21 March 2016, Google Doodle commemorated her 85th birthday.
