= Ada Burrone =

Italian writer (1933–2014)

Ada Burrone (Fabbrica Curone, 26 April 1933 – Milan, 30 June 2014) was an Italian activist and writer, founder of the Attivecomeprima Association, a non-profit organization engaged in support activities (medical and psychological) for those affected from cancer.

== Biography ==
Ada Burrone was living and working in Milan when, at the age of 36 and with a 12-year-old son, she was diagnosed with breast cancer. Following this experience and with the support of her surgeon, Pietro Bucalossi, and the encouragement of Umberto Veronesi, she founded the Attivecomeprima Association in 1973 with psychologists, doctors, and former patients. Since then, her work, initially aimed at people affected by breast cancer and later extended to all oncology patients, was carried out within the association, of which she was president until 2013.

She died at the age of 81 on 30 June 2014.

In addition to being the author of texts for conducting psychological support groups, Ada Burrone was also a publicist and director of the magazine Attive.

== Awards ==
She has won:

- International Recognition S. Rita da Cascia (1998)
- Special Marisa Bellisario Award (2005)
- Ambrogino d'oro, gold medal, 2009

== Works ==
- La terapia degli affetti with Franco Fornari (ed. Attivecomeprima)
- Il gusto di vivere with Gianni Maccarini, foreword by Umberto Veronesi (ed. Oscar Mondadori Guide), 1993
- M'amo non m'amo (ed. Attivecomeprima), 2007
- La danza della vita, FrancoAngeli, 2008
- La forza di vivere (ed. Attivecomeprima)
- Lettera ai medici di domani (ed. Attivecomeprima)
- Papaveri e fiordalisi (ed. FrancoAngeli), 2012
