= Alberto Oliverio =

Alberto Oliverio (born 1 December 1938) is a biologist and psycho-biologist. He is currently professor of Psychobiology at the Sapienza University of Rome. He has been one of the main assistants of Nobel prize winner Daniel Bovet.

== Publications ==
Oliverio is author or co-author of about 400 publications. He is author of about 30 chapters or general reviews in edited books or annual reviews. Has edited 6 books on animal behavior and behavioral genetics and is the author of many books on memory, brain and behavior.

== Research fields ==
Neurochemical – neurophysiological correlates of memory. Genetic approaches to behavior.

== Books ==
- Oliverio A. & Oliverio Ferraris A., Lo sviluppo comparato del comportamento, Boringhieri, Turin, 1974.
- Oliverio A. & Oliverio Ferraris A., Psicologia: Basi biologiche, sviluppo, ambiente, Zanichelli, Bologna, 1976; 2nd Edition, 1980; 3rd Edition (Psicologia: I motivi del comportamento umano), 1986; 4th Edition, 1990; 5th edition 1996; 6th edition 2002; 7th edition 2007.
- Oliverio A., (Ed.) Zoologia 1: Comunicazione e comportamento sociale. Letture da Le Scienze, Le Scienze, Milan, 1977.
- Oliverio A., Maturità e vecchiaia, Feltrinelli, Milan, 1977.
- Oliverio A.. (Ed.) Genetics, Environment and Intelligence, North Holland, Amsterdam, 1977.
- Oliverio A. & Oliverio Ferraris A., Maschio/Femmina: Biologia, psicologia, sociologia nel comportamento sessuale, Zanichelli, Bologna, 1978.
- Oliverio A., La società solitaria, Editori Riuniti, Rome, 1979.
- Oliverio A. Come nasce un conformista, Editori Riuniti, Rome, 1980. Portuguese Transl: Como nasce um conformista, Moraes / Sódilivros, 1986
- Oliverio A. & Castellano C., I farmaci del cervello: Droghe e psicofarmaci. Classeunica n. 206, ERI, Rome, 1980.
- Oliverio A., (Ed.) Cervello e comportamento, Newton Compton, Rome, 1981.
- Oliverio A., Biologia e comportamento, Zanichelli, Bologna, 1982 (2nd. Edition, 1987).
- Oliverio A., (Ed.) "Orologi biologici, Quaderni de Le Scienze" n.9, Le Scienze, Milan, 1982.
- Oliverio A., Saper invecchiare, Libri di Base, Editori Riuniti, Rome, 1982.
- Oliverio A., I meccanismi dell'apprendimento, Frontiere della Scienza, Fabbri Editori, Milan 1983.
- Ferraris A. & Oliverio A., I ritmi della vita, Libri di base, Editori Riuniti, Rome, 1983.
- Oliverio A. & Oliverio A., L'alba del comportamento umano, Laterza, Rome, 1983.
- Oliverio A. & Michele Zappella, (Ed.) The behavior of human Infants, Plenum Press, New York, 1983.
- Oliverio A., Le scienze: letture di chimica e biologia, Laterza, Rome, 1984.
- Oliverio A., La materia e i numeri, Laterza, Rome, 1984.
- Oliverio A., Lo spazio e il tempo, Laterza, Rome, 1984.
- Oliverio A., Storia naturale della mente: l'evoluzione del comportamento, Boringhieri, Turin, 1984.
- Oliverio A. & Oliverio A., La scienza e l'immaginario, Editori Riuniti, Rome, 1986.
- Oliverio A., Alfabeto della mente, Edizioni Dedalo, Bari, 1986.
- Oliverio A., L'evoluzione del cervello, Scienza e Dossier (Suppl.) n.8, November 1986.
- Oliverio A., Dalle molecole al cervello, Scienza e Dossier (Suppl.) n. 15, Giugno 1987.
- Oliverio A. & Oliverio A., "Nei labirinti della mente, Laterza, Rome, 1989. Spanish transl: En los laberintos de la mente, Grijalbo, Argentina Ponente, México, 1992". Economica Laterza, Rome, 1998.
- Oliverio A., Per puro caso, Leonardo, Milano, 1989 (Edizione Euroclub, Milano, 1990).
- Oliverio A., Il tempo ritrovato: la memoria e le neuroscienze, Theoria, Rome, 1990.
- Puglisi-Allegra S. & Oliverio A., (Eds.) "Psychobiology of Stress", NATO ASI Series, Behavioural and Social Sciences Vol. 54, Kluwer Academic Publishers, Dordrecht, 1990.
- Oliverio A., Neandertal, Leonardo, Milan, 1993.
- Ferraris A. e Oliverio A. La persona, la sessualità, l'amore. Loescher, Turin1994.
- Oliverio A. Ricordi individuali, memorie collettive, Einaudi, Turin, 1994.
- Oliverio A. Biologia e filosofia della mente, Laterza, Rome, 1995.
- Oliverio A. L'arte di pensare, Rizzoli, Milan, 1997. BUR Saggi, Milan 1999. Japanese transl: 論理的思考の技術 Daiwa Shobo, Tokio, 2003.
- Oliverio A. L'arte di ricordare, Rizzoli, Milan, 1998. 6 editions. BUR Saggi, Milan 2000. Edizioni Mondolibri, 1999. BUR Saggi, Milan, 2000. Spanish transl: La memoria. El arte de recordar. Alianza Editorial, Madrid, 2000. Portuguese transl: A memória e os seus segredos. Editorial Presença, Lisbona, 2001. Japanese transl: 覚える技術 Shoeisha, Tokio, 2002.
- Oliverio A. L'arte di imparare. Rizzoli, Milan, 1999 BUR Saggi, Milano 2001. Japanese transl: SogenSha, Tokyo 2006. 東京創元社 メタ認知的アプローチによる学ぶ技術
- Oliverio A. Esplorare la mente. Il cervello tra filosofia e biologia. Raffaello Cortina, Milan, 1999.
- Oliverio A. La mente. Istruzioni per l'uso. Rizzoli, Milan, 2001. BUR Saggi, Milan 2004.
- Oliverio A. Prima lezione di Neuroscienze. Laterza, Rome, 2002.
- Oliverio A. Dove ci porta la scienza. Laterza, Rome, 2003.
- Oliverio A. Memoria e oblio. Rubbettino, Soveria mannelli, 2003.
- Oliverio A. e Oliverio Ferraris A. Le età della mente, Rizzoli, Milan, 2004. BUR Saggi, Milan 2005.
- Oliverio A. Istruzioni per restare intelligenti. Rizzoli, Milan, 2005. BUR Saggi, Milan 2006. MondoLibri, Milan, 2006. Albanian transl: Botimet Max, Tirana 2006 Si ta ruajmë inteligjencën.
- Oliverio A. "Come nasce un’idea. Intelligenza, creatività, genio nell’era della distrazione". Rizzoli, Milano, 2006. Mondolibri, Milano, 2007. Korean Transl: "MINUMSA" 2008 Greek Transl: "Lector", 2009. Japanese transl: "SogenSha", Tokio
- Oliverio A. "Geografia della mente. Territori cerebrali e comportamenti umani". Raffaello Cortina, Milano, 2008.
- Oliverio A. "La vita nascosta del cervello". Giunti, Firenze, 2009.
- Oliverio A. "Cervello" Bollati Boringhieri 2012. Spanish transl: "Cerebro", "Adriana Hidalgo Editora", 2013.
- Oliverio A. "Immaginazione e memoria" Mondadori Università 2013.
- Oliverio Ferraris A. e Oliverio A. "Più forti delle avversità". "Bollati Boringhieri", 2014.
- Oliverio A. "Il cervello che impara", "Giunti", Firenze 2017
