= Nicolas Grimaldi =

French philosopher (1933–2026)

- Born: 24 December 1933; 14th arrondissement of Paris
- Died: 13 February 2026 (aged 92); Lyon, France
- Occupation: Philosopher
- Awards: Grand prix de la Critique littéraire (2011); Prix Dagnan-Bouveret, 2014

Education
- Education: Paris Nanterre University
- Thesis: Le Désir et le temps
- Doctoral advisor: Paul Ricœur

Philosophical work
- Institutions: Paris-Sorbonne University (professor emeritus)
- Notable students: Éric-Emmanuel Schmitt
- Notable works: Désir et le temps (1971)

Nicolas Grimaldi (French: [nikola ɡʁimaldi]; 24 December 1933 – 13 February 2026) was a French philosopher.

== Background and education ==
Of Corsican origin, Grimaldi was the son of Dominique Grimaldi, a professor engaged with the Workers' Force and the French Section of the Workers' International.

He became fixated on literature at the age of thirteen, when he said he dreamed of being a poet and was driven "mad" (fou) by Victor Hugo and Rimbaud. Nietzsche and Pascal drew him into philosophy.

As a student of Vladimir Jankélévitch, he earned his agrégation in 1959 and his doctorate in 1970, with a thesis titled Le Désir et le temps under the direction of Paul Ricœur.

== Career and influences ==
For many years, he taught students enrolled in classes préparatoires. He spent time on the faculties at the University of Western Brittany in Brest and the University of Poitiers.

He concluded his career as a professor at Paris-Sorbonne University, where he held the chair in metaphysics.

Influences on his thought included Maine de Biran, Alain Badiou, and Henri Bergson. In 2015, he led the workshop on love with Cynthia Fleury, an event hosted by Les Rencontres Philosophiques de Monaco. His interview at the event was transmitted through podcast channels, YouTube, and a transcript in the hosting organization's publication, the atelier L'Amour.

== Personal life ==
He lived quietly among books in Saint-Jean-de-Luz, never seeking the spotlight and, lamenting the decline of the humanities, he was disturbed by what he characterized as the "effervescence of the void and the nihilistic trance" of mainstream society. He loved reading: Balzac, Stendhal, Tolstoy, Sarte, Dino Buzzati, Proust, André Breton, and Georges Simenon.

== Death and legacy ==
Grimaldi died in Lyon on 13 February 2026, at the age of 92. He is remembered as a statesman and a writer, notable for his works on Nobel laureate for literature in 1952 François Mauriac, the writer Jean-René Huguenin, the sinologist Simon Leys, Marcel Proust, and for his special knowledge of René Descartes.

== Selected works ==
=== Books ===
- Le Désir et le Temps (Vrin, 1971)
- Aliénation et Liberté (1972)
- L'Expérience de la pensée dans la philosophie de Descartes (Vrin, 1978)
- L'Art ou la feinte passion. Essai sur l'expérience esthétique (1983)
- Introduccion a la filosofia de la historia de K. Marx (1986)
- Six études sur la volonté et la liberté chez Descartes (Vrin, 1988)
- Descartes. La morale (Vrin, 1992)
- La Jalousie, étude sur l'imaginaire proustien (1993)
- Ontologie du temps (1993)
- Partie réservée à la correspondance (1995)
- L'Ardent sanglot (1995)
- Le Souffre et le Lilas. Essai sur l'esthétique de Van Gogh (1995)
- Études cartésiennes: Dieu, le temps, la liberté (Vrin, 1996. ISBN 9782711612628)
- Le Travail, communion et excommunication (1998)
- Bref Traité du désenchantement (PUF, 1998)
- Ambiguïtés de la liberté (1999)
- L'Homme disloqué (PUF, 2001)
- Traité des solitudes (PUF, 2003. ISBN 9782130636731)
- Socrate, le sorcier (PUF, 2004)
- Bref traité du désenchantement (PUF, 2004, ISBN 9782130682417)
- Traité de la banalité (PUF, 2005)
- Le Livre de Judas (PUF, 2006)
- Descartes et ses fables (2006)
- Préjugés et paradoxes (PUF, 2007)
- Proust, les horreurs de l'amour (PUF, 2008)
- Une démence ordinaire (PUF, 2009, ISBN 9782130640783)
- Essai sur la jalousie. L'enfer proustien (2010)
- L'inhumain (PUF, 2011)
- Métamorphoses de l’amour (2011)
- L'Effervescence du vide (Grasset, 2012, ISBN 9782246790747)
- Les Théorèmes du moi (Grasset, 2013)
- À la lisière du réel. Dialogue avec Anne-Claire Désesquelles (2013)
- Raison et religion à l'époque des Lumières (Berg International, 2014)
- Le Crépuscule de la démocratie (Grasset, 2014)
- Les Idées en place. Mon abécédaire philosophique (PUF, 2014)
- Un été avec Proust (with Julia Kristeva, Jean-Yves Tadié & others: Éditions des Équateurs, 2014, ISBN 9782849903186)
- Les Nouveaux Somnambules (Grasset, 2016)
- Mémoires d'un passager clandestin (2016)
- Trois éclaircies sur le Bien, le Beau, le Vrai (Colonna, 2016)
- L'Art ou la Feinte Passion (Le Livre de Poche, 2018, ISBN 9782823862638)
- Sortilèges de l'imaginaire (PUF, 2019)
- Les songes de la raison (Le Livre de Poche, 2020)
- Proust, les horreurs de l'amour (PUF, 2022, ISBN 9782130835455)

=== Articles ===
- Grimaldi, Nicolas. “La Dialectique Du Fini et de l’infini Dans La Philosophie de Descartes.” Revue de Métaphysique et de Morale 74, no. 1 (1969): 21–54. http://www.jstor.org/stable/40901102.
- Grimaldi, Nicolas. “Le Temps Chez Descartes.” Revue Internationale de Philosophie 50, no. 195 (1) (1996): 163–91. http://www.jstor.org/stable/23954483.

== Television ==
- Philosophy Masterclass for Libération (DVD, Éditions Montparnasse) : L’Amour (with André Comte-Sponville, Anne Dufourmantelle, Michel Erman and Robert Maggiori)
