= André Comte-Sponville =

French philosopher (born 1952)

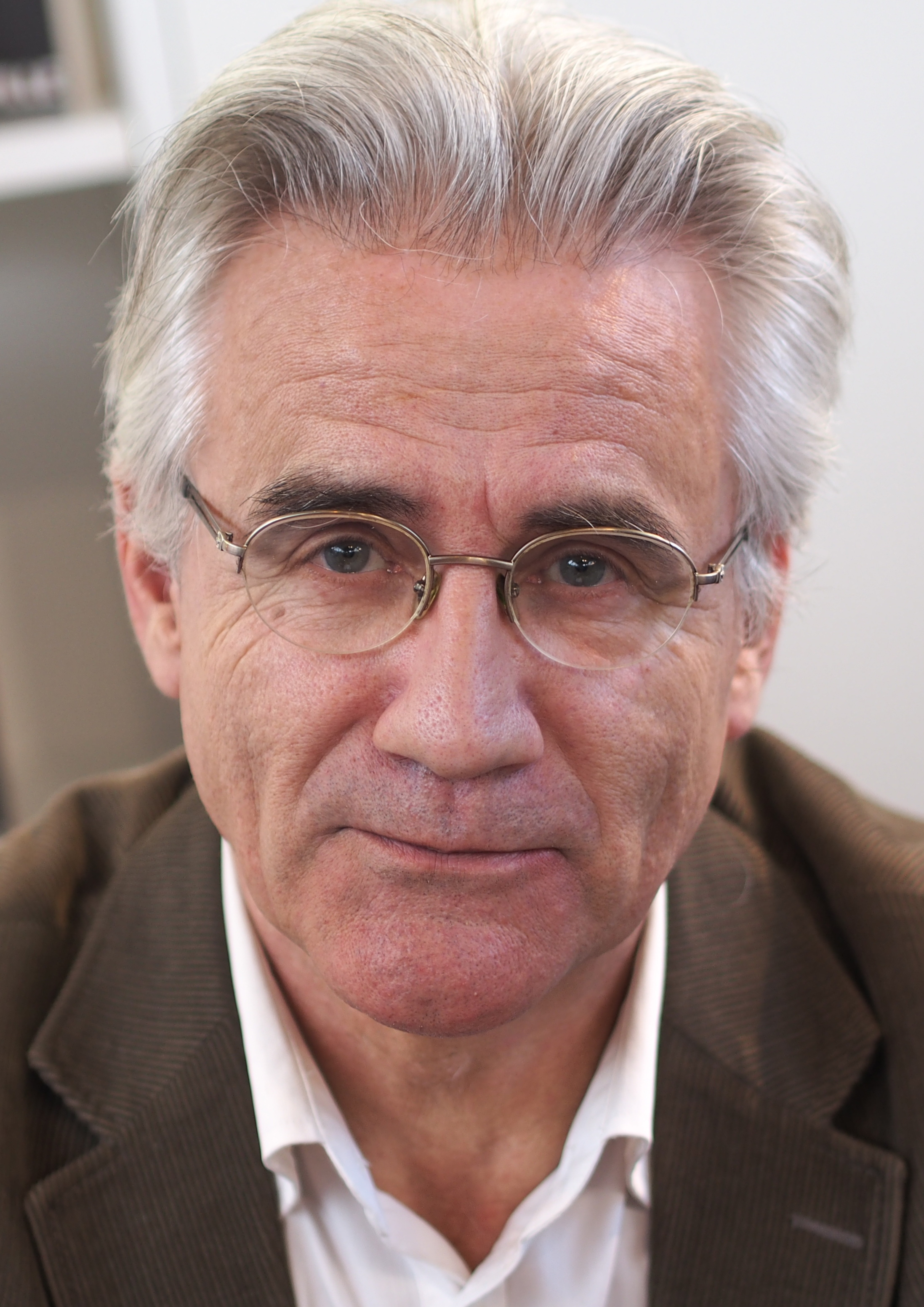
- Born: 12 March 1952 (age 74); Paris, France
- Education: École normale supérieure Pantheon-Sorbonne University (PhD)
- Occupation: Philosopher

André Comte-Sponville (born 12 March 1952) is a French philosopher.

== Biography ==
André Comte-Sponville was born in Paris, France. He studied in the École Normale Supérieure and earned a PhD from Panthéon-Sorbonne University, and is aggregated in philosophy. He is a proponent of atheism and materialism, but in a particular form, because of his spiritualistic aim.

The most important aspect of his work is an overcoming of traditional materialistic atheism in a perspective of post-materialism, because he demonstrates a spiritualization of atheism. This is especially present in his essay L'esprit de l'athéisme, published in 2006.

== Bibliography ==
- Traité du désespoir et de la béatitude (2 volumes, 1984–1988)
- Une éducation philosophique (1989)
- L'amour la solitude (1992)
- Petit Traité des Grandes Vertus (A Small Treatise on the Great Virtues or A Short Treatise on the Great Virtues) (1995), Translated into English by Catherine Temerson, Vintage, 2003, ISBN 0-09-943798-8
- Valeur et vérité (Etudes cyniques) (1995),
- Impromptus (1996)
- La sagesse des Modernes, written with Luc Ferry
- L'être temps (1999)
- Présentation de la philosophie (2000) (The Little Book of Philosophy) (2005), Translated into English by Frank Wynne, Vintage, 2005, ISBN 9780099450184
- Le bonheur, désespérément (2000)
- Le capitalisme est-il moral? (2004)
- L'esprit de l'athéisme (2006) Translated into English as The Little Book of Atheist Spirituality, Bantam (2009) ISBN 978-0-553-81990-8
- Le miel et l'absinthe : Poésie et philosophie chez Lucrèce (2008)
- Le tragique de la décision médicale : La mort d'un enfant ou la naissance de l'absurde with Denis Devictor (2008)
- Le sexe ni la mort (2012), edition Albin Michel.

== Audio ==
- "Le bonheur - visions occidentale et chinoise", a three CD spoken word audio conference and discussion with Francois Julien, 2007.

== Television ==
- Philosophy Masterclass for Libération (DVD, Éditions Montparnasse) : L’Amour (with Robert Maggiori, Anne Dufourmantelle, Michel Erman and Nicolas Grimaldi)
