= Payot & Rivages =

- Parent company: Actes Sud
- Predecessor: Lagardère Group
- Founded: 1877, 1912, 1984
- Founders: Payot family, Édouard de Andréis, Jacqueline & Jean-Louis Guiramand
- Country of origin: France
- Headquarters location: Paris, Lausanne, Marseille
- Key people: Pascal Vandenberghe (Payot CEO, 2004-2024)
- Fiction genres: Crime fiction, philosophy, social sciences, translated literature, tourist guides
- Official website: https://www.payot-rivages.fr

Payot & Rivages (pronounced [pajɔ e ʁivaʒ]) is an independent French publishing company, based in Paris, formed by the merger of Éditions Payot and Éditions Rivages in 1992, then for many years it was part of the Lagardère Group, and finally it was acquired by Actes Sud in 2013. The Payot side has the longest history and is best known for its chain of bookstores (Payot Librairie) in Switzerland and France. The Rivages side has a long tradition for publishing acclaimed and contemporary literature and philosophy.

== History ==
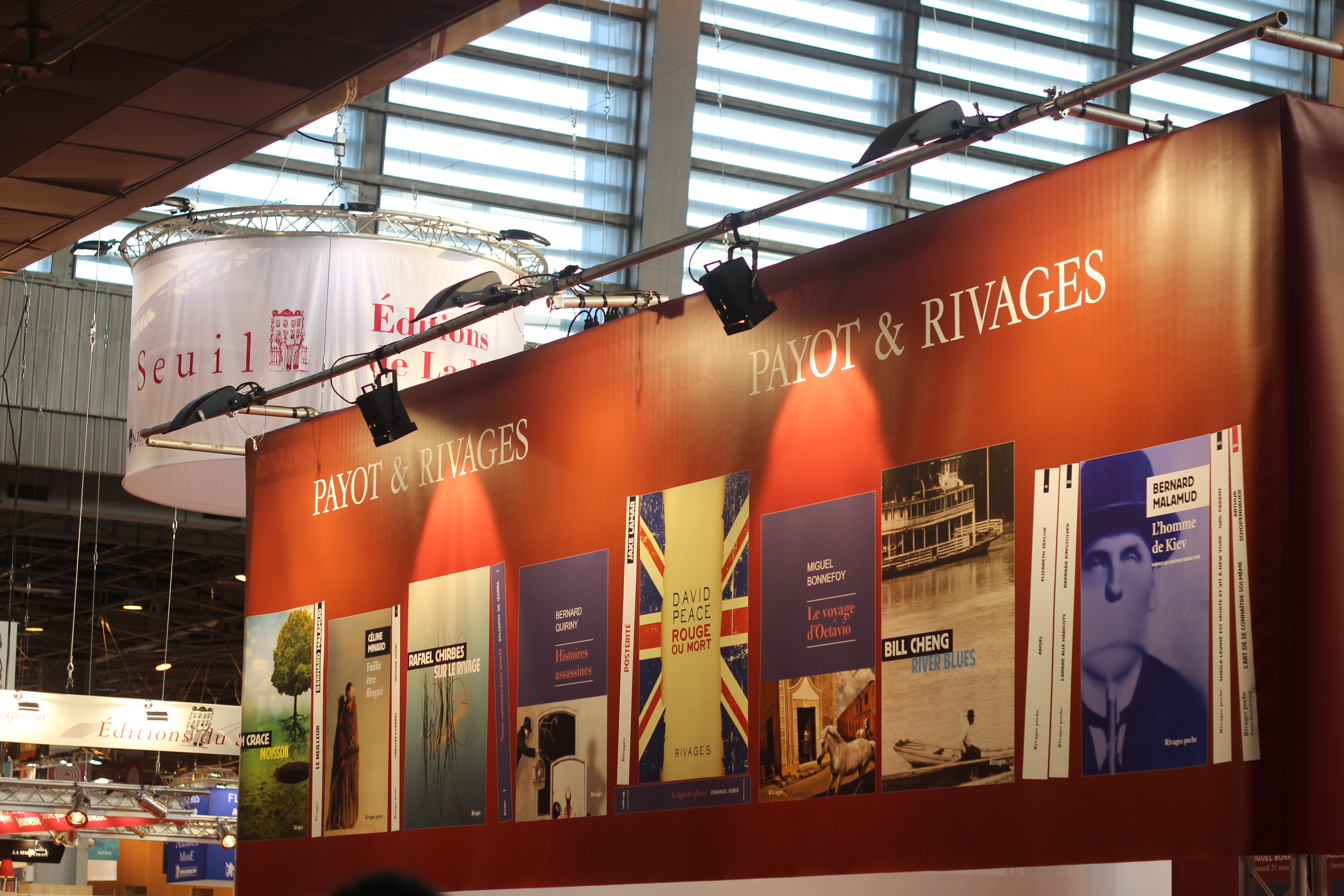
Payot & Rivages - Festival du Livre de Paris 2015

Éditions Payot was founded in 1877 in Lausanne by Fritz Payot and expanded to France in 1912. His descendant Jean-Marc Payot sold the Payot company to the Swiss group Edipresse in 1986. That same year, François Guérif established the Noir fiction division at Rivages, which to this today has published authors like James Ellroy and Donald Westlake.

In 1990, Hachette Distribution Service, a subsidiary of the Lagardère Group, acquired a majority stake in Payot. The company rebranded its bookstores under the new name and logo of "Payot Libraire." The publishing house also operated independently despite its corporate takeover.

In 1992, Éditions Payot merged with Éditions Rivages, which had been founded in 1984 by Édouard de Andréis along with Jacqueline and Jean-Louis Guiramand in Marseille. Rivages brought into "Payot et Rivages" its extensive catalogue of literature and fiction. Rivages was also known for La Petite Bibliothèque Rivages, founded in 1988 by Lidia Breda, as a library of contemporary thought. Its nearly 1,000 titles include authors such as Giorgio Agamben, Anne Dufourmantelle, and Corine Pelluchon, and also continues to publish works by Hannah Arendt, Albert Einstein, Karl Kraus, Arthur Schnitzler, and Hermann Hesse.

In 2004, Payot & Rivages was still part of the Lagardère Group when Pascal Vandenberghe became the CEO on the Payot side; Vandenberghe departed in 2024. Actes Sud acquired Payot & Rivages in 2013.

== Awards and distinctions ==
The Collection Petite Bibliothèque Rivages won the Publisher's Prize from Les Rencontres Philosophiques de Monaco 2021. The Petite Bibliothèque Rivages series is directed by Lidia Breda at Payot & Rivages.

== Rivages collections ==
- Noir collections including detective fiction published by François Guérif at Éditions Rivages from 1986 to present: Rivages/Noir
- Titles of Noir fiction published by François Guérif at Rivages and by Alexis Nolent at Casterman between 2008-2013: Rivages/Casterman/Noir
- Thriller and mystery novels published at Éditions Rivages between 1988-2003: Rivages/Mystère
