= Vladimir Jankélévitch =

French philosopher (1903–1985)

- Born: 31 August 1903; Bourges, France
- Died: 6 June 1985 (aged 81); Paris, France

Education
- Education: École Normale Supérieure; University of Lille
- Doctoral advisor: Léon Brunschvicg
- Other advisors: Henri Bergson; Émile Bréhier

Philosophical work
- Era: 20th-century philosophy
- Region: Western philosophy
- School: Continental philosophy Bergsonism; Philosophy of life
- Institutions: University of Toulouse; University of Lille; University of Paris; Paris I University
- Notable students: Robert Maggiori; Nicolas Grimaldi
- Main interests: Metaphysics, ethics, music, temporality
- Notable ideas: The mystery of the instant

Vladimir Jankélévitch (French: [ʒɑ̃kelevitʃ]; 31 August 1903 – 6 June 1985) was a French philosopher and musicologist.

== Biography ==
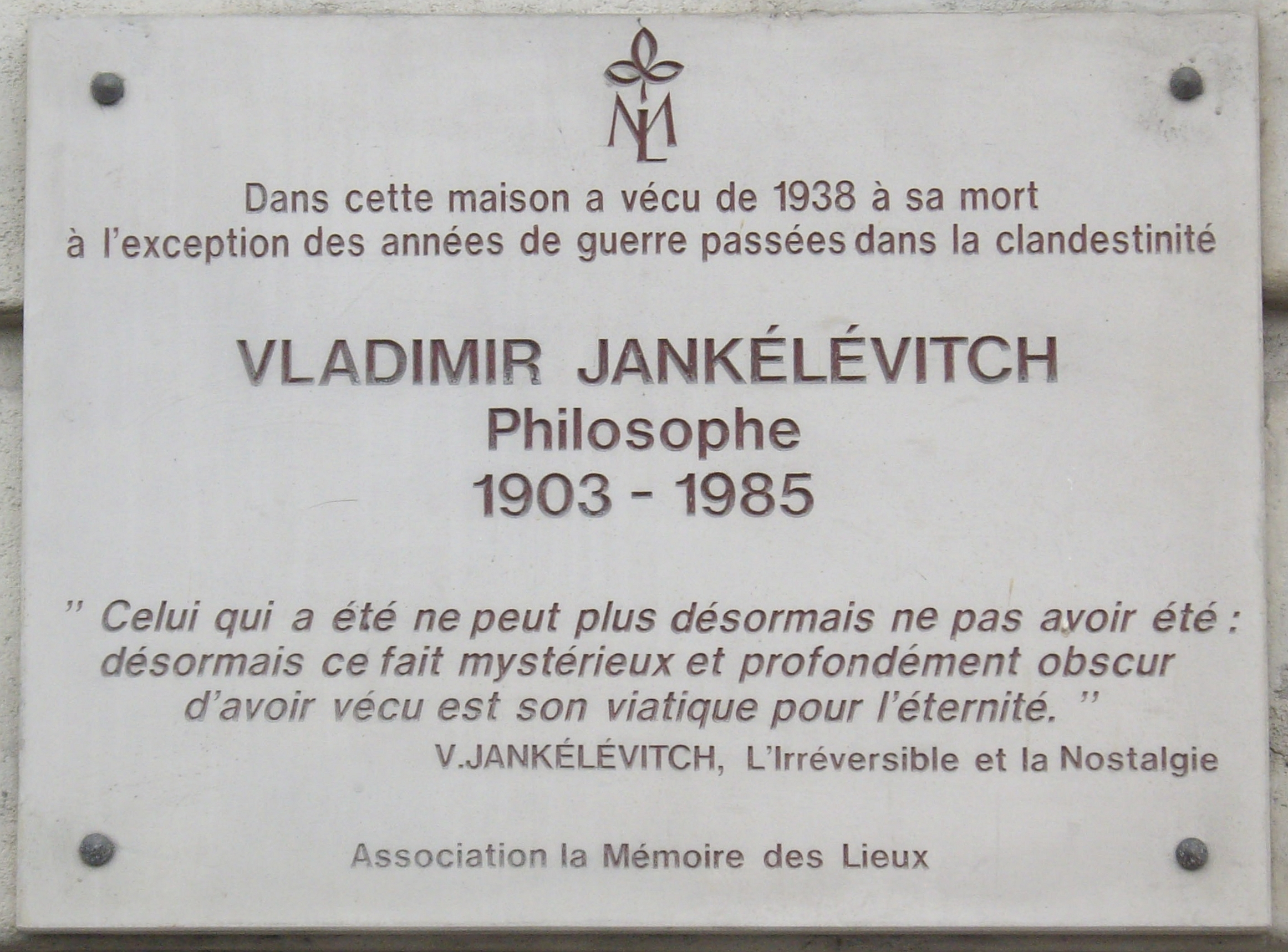
Plaque Vladimir Jankélévitch, 1A quai aux Fleurs, Paris 4

Jankélévitch was the son of Russian Jewish parents, who had emigrated to France.

In 1922, he started studying philosophy at the École Normale Supérieure in Paris. His first meeting with Henri Bergson was in 1923, and over the years the two developed a close friendship. In 1924, he completed his DES thesis (diplôme d'études supérieures, roughly equivalent to an MA thesis) on Le Traité : la dialectique. Ennéade I 3 de Plotin under the direction of Émile Bréhier. In 1926, he passed the agregation in philosophy, achieving the top of his class.

From 1927 to 1932, he taught at the Institut Français in Prague, where he wrote his doctorate on Schelling. He returned to France in 1933, where he taught at the Lycée du Parc in Lyon and at many universities, including Toulouse and Lille.

In 1940, he was dismissed from the military and banned from teaching and publishing by the antisemitic policies of the Vichy government. In 1941, he joined the French Resistance, through which he resumed his teaching and writing underground.

After the war, in 1951, he was appointed to the chair of Moral Philosophy at the Sorbonne (Paris I after 1971), where he taught until 1979.

In 1968, he was among the few French professors to participate in the May 68 protests.

== Writing and teaching ==
He was distinctive in, among many other ways, his heavy use of exclamation marks. Of his writing, his friend and fellow philosopher Emmanuel Lévinas said, “Each word sprang up as new, […] as if, here, thought never left the flowing waters of its spontaneity, mistrusting the facile habits of language, its verbal habits and its rhetoric.” He labored on the subject of forgiveness in such works as Le Pardon and L’Imprescriptible, with particular emphasis on The Holocaust.

His students at the Sorbonne, such as French-Italian philosopher Robert Maggiori, remember him for his impassioned teaching style and charming idiosyncrasies. Maggiori wrote his doctoral thesis on Jankélévitch, never completed because of the man's death and that Maggiori did not want to complete under any other supervision. Robert Zaretsky also wrote about the strong impression Jankélévitch made upon his students and of the way that his colleagues were often daunted by him. Maggiori explains that Jankélévitch was simply very different from many of his colleagues in that he tended to be more sentimental and literary in his writing and teaching.

Jankélévitch made the je-ne-sais-quoi ("I know not what") a central concept in his philosophy, applying it to ontology, ethics and aesthetics. In Le Je-ne-sais-quoi et le Presque-rien (1957), he used the term to describe what escapes reductive or purely rational explanation: the elusive difference between a thing's essence and its existence. He characterized the je-ne-sais-quoi as a presque-rien ("almost nothing"), neither an object nor a mode of being, but something singular that appears fleetingly and is grasped through intuition and alertness rather than structural or conceptual analysis.

=== On virtue ===
In his Traité des vertus (1949), Jankélévitch extended the notion of the je-ne-sais-quoi to virtues: goodness, for example. He distinguished enduring “virtues of the interval” from more fragile and intense “virtues of the point”, which are never fully possessed and arise in response to the unpredictable demands and desires, leading to action in the moment. According to Philosophie Magazine, the je-ne-sais-quoi in virtue is the surplus of sincerity, purity, love or disinterestedness that makes an act genuinely moral rather than merely an instance of duty or meritorious effort.

=== On music ===
Jankélévitch developed the aesthetic dimension of the je-ne-sais-quoi through his writings on music. He associated it with charme, the elusive quality that distinguishes the beautiful from the sublime and makes a thing special and irreplaceable. In Fauré ou l’inexprimable (1974), he described this charm as indeducible, indivisible, indefinable and inexpressible. Because the je-ne-sais-quoi resists conceptual analysis, Jankélévitch held that it can be approached only indirectly, by describing what it is not; music, for him, expresses it more adequately than language, which tends toward reduction.

Jankélévitch wrote twelve books on composers of music and extensively on the philosophy of music. To him, music was a paradox: deep but also superficial, that is both aesthetic and philosophical. It was a way to express the "inexpressible," as he wrote in La Musique et l’Ineffable (1961). In studying the philosophy of music, he nevertheless insisted that music is beyond structural analysis.

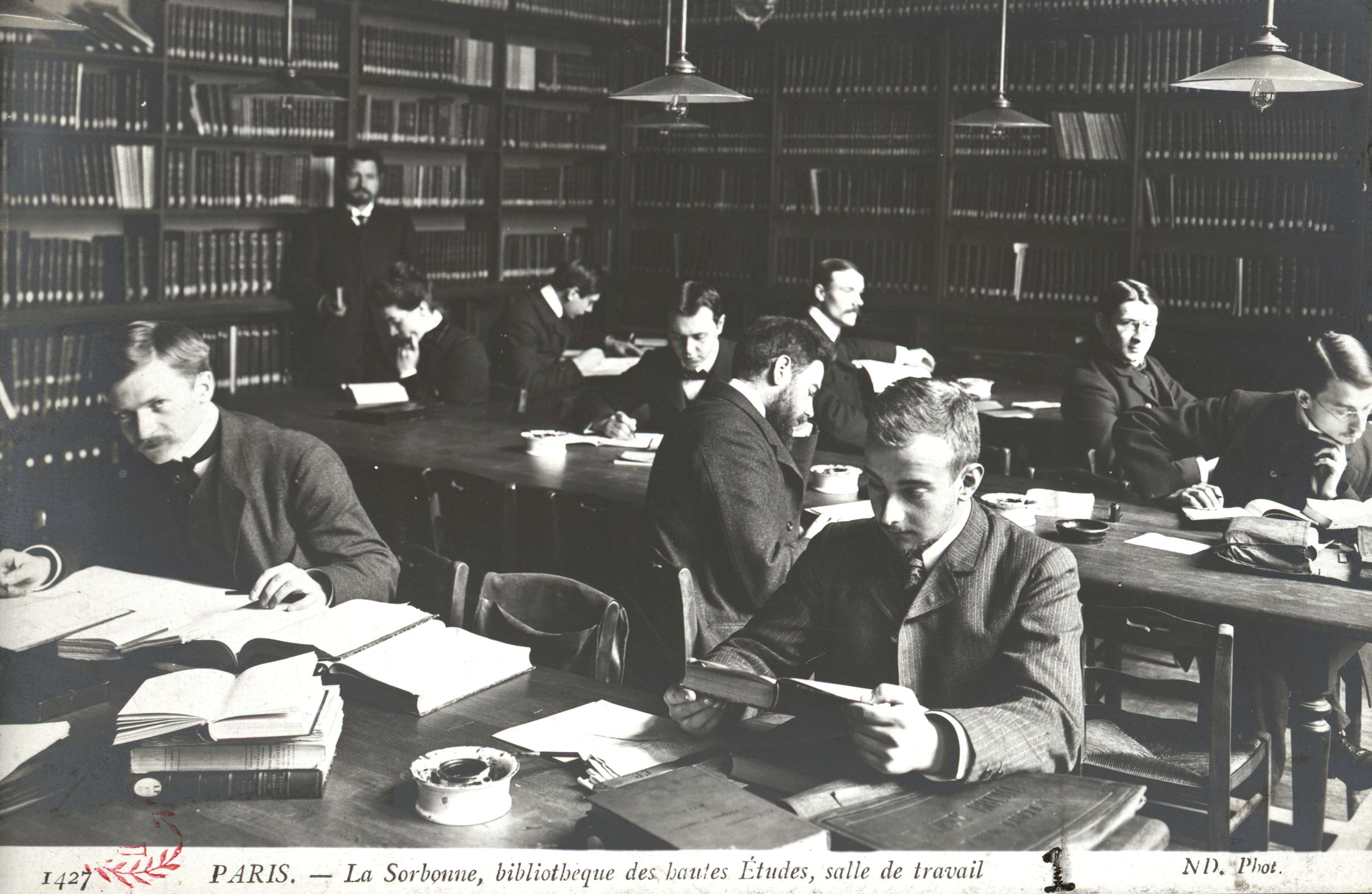
The current Jankélévitch Room at the Sorbonne Library

== Bibliography ==
=== French-language ===
- 1931: Henri Bergson (PUF, 1959; 1989; coll. Quadrige, 2008)
- 1933: L'Odyssée de la conscience dans la dernière philosophie de Schelling (Alcan)
- 1933: Valeur et signification de la mauvaise conscience
- 1936: La Mauvaise conscience (Alcan; PUF, 1951)
- 1936: L'Ironie ou la bonne conscience (Alcan; PUF; L'Ironie, Flammarion, 1964; 2nd ed., L'Ironie, Flammarion, 2026: ISBN 9782080165367)
- 1938: L'Alternative (Alcan)
- 1938: Gabriel Fauré, ses mélodies, son esthétique (2nd ed., Plon)
- 1939: Ravel (2nd ed., Seuil, 1956: ISBN 9782020002233)
- 1942: Du mensonge (Confluences)
- 1947: Le Mal (Arthaud)
- 1949: Traité des vertus (Bordas)
- 1950: Debussy et le mystère de I'instant (Éditions La Baconnière, 1949; Plon, 2019: ISBN 9782259278287)
- 1954: Philosophie première introduction à une philosophie du Presque (PUF, coll. Quadrige, 2011: ISBN 9782130586425)
- 1956: L'Austérité et la Vie morale (Aubier; Flammarion, 1954)
- 1957: Le Je-ne-sais quoi et le presque-rien (PUF)
- 1960: Le Pur et l'impur (Extract in La Pureté du cœur, Flammarion, 2025: ISBN 9782080483799)
- 1961: La Musique et l'Ineffable (Seuil, 2015: ISBN 9782021280913)
- 1963: L'Aventure, l'Ennui, le Sérieux (Flammarion, 2017, ISBN 9782081416819
- 1966: La Mort (Flammarion, 2017: ISBN 9782081416499)
- 1967: Le pardon (Aubier; Flammarion, 2019, ISBN 9782081473850)
- 1968: Le Sérieux de l'intention (Traité des vertus I, Flammarion, 2011: ISBN 9782081252370)
- 1970: Les Vertus et l'Amour (Traité des vertus II, Flammarion, 2011: ISBN 9782081252394)
- 1971: L 'Imprescriptible
- 1972: L'Innocence et la méchanceté {Traité des vertus III, Flammarion, 2011: ISBN 9782081252400)
- 1974: L'Irréversible et la nostalgie (Flammarion, 2026: ISBN 9782080168993)
- 1978: Quelque part dans l'inachevé, en collaboration avec Béatrice Berlowitz (Gallimard/Folio, 1987: ISBN 9782070324149)
- 1980: Le Je-ne-sais-quoi et le presque rien (Points, 1981: ISBN 9782020058100)
- 1981: Le Paradoxe de la morale (Seuil, 1981: ISBN 9782020060288)

=== Anthologies ===
- Un homme libre: L'immédiat ; La tentation, (Frémeaux & Associés, 2024, ISBN 9782844689900)

=== Posthumous publication ===
- 1994 Penser la mort? Entretiens, collection by F. Schwab, Paris. Liana Levi

=== English-language translations ===
- Ravel. Translated by Margaret Crosland. New York: Grove Press, 1959.
- Music and the Ineffable. Translated by Carolyn Abbate. Princeton: Princeton University Press, 2003. ISBN 9780691268385.
- Forgiveness. Translated and with an introduction by Andrew Kelley. Chicago: University of Chicago Press, 2005. ISBN 9780226392134.
- The Bad Conscience. Translated and with an introduction by Andrew Kelley. Chicago: University of Chicago Press, 2014. ISBN 9780226009537.
- Henri Bergson. Translated by Nils F. Schott; edited by Nils F. Schott and Alexandre Lefebvre. Durham, NC: Duke University Press, 2015.
- The Paradox of Morality. Translated by Andrew Kelley. New Haven: Yale University Press, 2025. ISBN 9780300269260.
- "Should We Pardon Them?" Selected translated by Ann Hobart. Critical Inquiry 22, no. 3 (1996): 552–572.

=== German-language translations ===
- Maurice Ravel in Selbstzeugnissen und Bilddokumenten. Translated by Willi Reich. Reinbek bei Hamburg: Rowohlt Verlag, 1958.
- Kann man den Tod denken? Translated and edited by Jürgen Brankel; foreword by Françoise Schwab. Vienna: Turia + Kant, 2003.
- Das Verzeihen. Translated by Claudia Brede-Konersmann; edited by Ralf Konersmann. Frankfurt am Main: Suhrkamp Verlag, 2003.
- Bergson lesen. Translated by Jürgen Brankel; foreword, notes and bibliography by Françoise Schwab. Vienna: Turia + Kant, 2004.
- Der Tod. Translated by Brigitta Restorff. Frankfurt am Main: Suhrkamp, 2005.
- Erste Philosophie: Einleitung in eine Philosophie des „Beinahe“. Translated by Jürgen Brankel. Vienna: Turia + Kant, 2006.
- Irgendwo im Unvollendeten, with Béatrice Berlowitz. Translated by Jürgen Brankel. Vienna: Turia + Kant, 2008.
- Das Ich-weiß-nicht-was und das Beinahe-Nichts. Translated by Jürgen Brankel. Vienna and Berlin: Turia + Kant, 2009.
- Die Ironie. Translated by Jürgen Brankel. Berlin: Suhrkamp, 2012.
- Satie und der Morgen. Translated by Ulrich Kunzmann; afterword by Richard Schroetter. Berlin: Matthes & Seitz, 2015.
- Die Musik und das Unaussprechliche. Translated by Ulrich Kunzmann; afterword by Andreas Vejvar. Berlin: Suhrkamp, 2016.
- Von der Lüge. Translated by Sarah Dornhof and Vincent von Wroblewsky. Berlin: Parerga Verlag, 2004.
- Von der Lüge. Translated by Sarah Dornhof and Vincent von Wroblewsky; edited by Steffen Dietzsch. Hamburg: Felix Meiner, 2016.
- Zauber, Improvisation, Virtuosität: Schriften zur Musik. Translated by Ulrich Kunzmann; edited by Andreas Vejvar. Berlin: Suhrkamp, 2020.
- Henri Bergson. Translated by Ulrich Kunzmann. Berlin: Suhrkamp, 2022.
- Das Unumkehrbare und die Nostalgie. Translated by Ulrich Kunzmann. Berlin: Suhrkamp, 2025.

=== Italian-language translations ===
- Ravel. Translated by Laura Lovisetti Fua. Milan: Arnoldo Mondadori Editore, 1962. ISBN 9788867230068.
- Il perdono. Translated by Liana Aurigemma. Milan: IPL, 1969.
- La coscienza ebraica. Translated by Daniel Vogelmann. Florence: Giuntina, 1986.
- Il paradosso della morale. Translated by Ruggero Guarini. Florence: Hopefulmonster, 1986.
- L'ironia. Translated by Fernanda Canepa. Genoa: Il Melangolo, 1988.
- Il non-so-che e il quasi-niente. Translated by Carlo Alberto Bonadies. Genoa: Marietti, 1987.
- Perdonare?. Translated by Daniel Vogelmann. Florence: Giuntina, 1987.
- Trattato delle virtù. Translated by Elina Klersy Imberciadori; selected by Francesco Alberoni; introduction by Robert Maggiori. Milan: Garzanti, 1987. Second edition, 1996. ISBN 9788811674559.
- L'avventura, la noia, la serietà. Translated by Carlo Alberto Bonadies. Genoa: Marietti, 1991.
- Debussy e il mistero. Translated by Carlo Migliaccio; edited by Enrica Lisciani-Petrini. Bologna: Il Mulino, 1991.
- Henri Bergson. Brescia: Morcelliana, 1991.
- Pensare la morte?. Translated and introduced by Enrica Lisciani-Petrini; preface by Françoise Schwab. Milan: Raffaello Cortina, 1995.
- Pensare la morte?. Translated and introduced by Enrica Lisciani-Petrini. Milan: Raffaello Cortina, 1995.
- La musica e l'ineffabile. Translated and edited by Enrica Lisciani-Petrini. Milan: Bompiani, 1998.
- La cattiva coscienza. Translated by Domenica Discipio. Bari: Edizioni Dedalo, 2000. ISBN 9788822002112.
- La menzogna e il malinteso. Translated by Marco Motto. Milan: Raffaello Cortina, 2000.
- Il male. Translated by Fernanda Canepa. Genoa: Marietti, 2003.
- Corso di filosofia morale: appunti raccolti alla Libera università di Bruxelles, 1962–1963. Italian edition edited by Antonio Delogu. Milan: Raffaello Cortina, 2007.
- La morte. Translated by Valeria Zini; edited by Enrica Lisciani-Petrini. Turin: Einaudi, 2009.
- Il non-so-che e il quasi-niente. Translated by Carlo Alberto Bonadies. Turin: Einaudi, 2011.
- Da qualche parte nell'incompiuto, with Béatrice Berlowitz. Translated by Valeria Zini; edited by Enrica Lisciani-Petrini. Turin: Einaudi, 2012.
- Simmel filosofo della vita. Edited by Laura Boella. Milan–Udine: Mimesis, 2013.
- Il puro e l'impuro. Translated by Valeria Zini; edited by Enrica Lisciani-Petrini. Turin: Einaudi, 2014.
- L'avventura, la noia, la serietà. Translated by Carlo Alberto Bonadies. Turin: Einaudi, 2018.
- Filosofia prima: introduzione a una filosofia del Quasi. Translated by Francesco Fogliotti; introductory essay by Lucio Saviani. Bergamo: Moretti & Vitali, 2020.
- La vita e la morte nella musica di Debussy. Translated and edited by Lorenzo Guagnano. Milan–Udine: Mimesis, 2024.

=== Other-language translations ===
==== Bosnian ====
- Smrt. Translated by Almasa Defterdarević-Muradbegović. Sarajevo: Zid, 1997.

==== Croatian ====
- Paradoks morala. Translated by Daniel Bućan; afterword by Dragutin Lučić Luce. Zagreb: AGM (Croatian publishing company), 2004.
- Smrt. Translated by Daniel Bućan. Zagreb: AGM, 2011. ISBN 978-953-174-412-6

==== Dutch ====
- De muziek en het onuitsprekelijke. Translated by Ronald Commers. Ghent, Belgium, 2005.

==== Serbian ====
- Muzika i neizrecivo. Translated by Jelena Jelić; foreword by Ivan Foht. Novi Sad: Književna zajednica Novog Sada, 1987.
- Ironija. Sremski Karlovci: Izdavačka knjižarnica Zorana Stojanovića, 1989.

==== Spanish ====
- La muerte. Translated by Manuel Arranz Lázaro. Valencia: Editorial Pre-Textos, 2002. ISBN 978-84-8191-441-2

== See also ==
- Jewish philosophy
- Unconditional love
- Forgiveness
- Virtue
