= Michele Zappella =

Italian psychiatrist (1936–2026)

- Born: 4 March 1936; Viareggio, Italy
- Died: 25 August 2026 (aged 90); Siena, Italy
- Occupation: Psychiatrist
- Employer: University of Siena

Michele Zappella (4 March 1936 – 24 August 2026) was an Italian psychiatrist and scholar of child neuropsychiatry. He was a native of Viareggio, Italy.

== Life and career ==
Zappella graduated in 1960 in Medicine and Surgery in Rome. He initially relocated to London, where he worked with the Fountain Hospital of London from 1961 to 1963. He then moved back to Rome, where he worked in the medical field and specialized in Pediatrics. As winner of a Fulbright grant for the United States, he became a Fellow of Neurology in the Department of Child Neurology at Children's Hospital in Washington D.C., serving there from 1964 to 1965. In 1966, he moved to Pisa, Italy, where he specialized first in Child Neuropsychiatry and then, in 1968, in Nervous and Mental Diseases. In 1970 he became Lecturer in Mental Health.

He was head of the Department of Child Neuropsychiatry of Siena Hospital from 1973 to 2006. As of 2011, he was teaching Child Neuropsychiatry in the Schools of Specialization of the University of Siena and served as a consultant in the Rett Center of Versilia Hospital in Italy.

Zappella was an honorary member of the Society for the Study of Behavioural Phenotypes in London and of the Italian Society of Pedagogy. He was the President of the Italian Society of Tourette's syndrome from 1999 to 2003, and Vice President of the Italian Society of Child Neuropsychiatry from 1976 to 1978.

He was involved in social integration and education of disabled children. From 1969 through 1970, he was focused on publishing the first papers on this subject.

In the 1960s, Zappella studied the Placing reflex and its connections with the early diagnosis of severe mental retardation. His studies on Rett syndrome have shown that there is a milder variant of this syndrome in which children acquire late some manual skills and spoken language. This variant is known as the Zappella variant of Rett syndrome (OMIM) in the scientific community.

Zappella extensively studied autistic disorders, discovering the dysmaturational syndrome, which manifests as a transitional autistic behavior, associated with motor and vocal tics, which has a genetic cause Tourette-like, quite different from stable Autistic Disorders. He introduced a form of rehabilitative therapy, known as Emotional Activation through Body Reciprocity (AERC).

In 1981, in recognition of his studies on autism, Zappella received the Gold Medal and the Honorary Citizenship of the town of Sesto San Giovanni, Italy.

Zappella died on 25 August 2026, at the age of 90.

== Published works ==
Zappella was the author of over 300 scientific publications, 105 indexed on PubMed – U.S. National Library of Medicine of National Institutes of Health. In 1980, he won the Glaxo Award for Science diffusion (Verona). He was recently Scientific Director of the magazine Autismo e Disturbi dello Sviluppo.

Italian

- Zappella, Michele. Le encefalopatie congenite del neonato e del lattante, Infanzia Anormale, 11, 1967.
- Zappella, Michele. Il Pesce Bambino, Milano: Feltrinelli, 1976. ISBN 978-88-07-79101-7; translated in French by Robert Maggiori, l'Enfant Poisson, Paris: Payot, 1979. ISBN 2-228-33510-X.
- Zappella, Michele. Il Bambino nella Luna, Milano: Feltrinelli, 1979. ISBN 978-88-07-81108-1.
- Zappella, Michele. Non vedo, non sento, non parlo, Milano: Mondadori, 1984; translated in Spanish, No veo, no oigo, no ablo, Paidos Terapia Familial, 1992. ISBN 84-7509-829-0.
- Zappella, Michele. I bambini autistici, l’holding e la famiglia, Roma: Nuova Italia Scientifica, 1987. ISBN 978-88-430-0996-1.
- A.A.V.V. Metodo Portage, ed. italiana a cura di Michele Zappella, Torino: Omega, 1989. ISBN 978-88-7241-087-5.
- Zappella, Michele. Autismo Infantile, Roma: Carocci, 1996. ISBN 978-88-430-3518-2; translated in Spanish, Autismo Infantìl, Instituto de Cultura Economica: Mexico, 1998. ISBN 84-7509-829-0.
- Zappella, Michele; with Dario Ianes. Facciamo il punto su l'autismo, Trento: Erickson, 2009. ISBN 978-88-6137-399-0.

English

- Zappella, Michele; with Alberto Oliverio. The behavior of human infants, New York: Plenum Press, 1983. ISBN 0-306-41470-8.
- Zappella, Michele; cooperated to Mary Coleman's The Neurology of Autism, New York: Oxford University Press, 2005. ISBN 978-0-19-518222-4.

== Biographical notes sources ==
- Anagrafe – Università di Roma La Sapienza – Roma, Italy
- Albo Ufficiale di Ateneo – Università di Pisa – Pisa, Italy
- Anagrafe della Ricerca – Università degli Studi di Siena – Siena, Italy
- Sede A.I.S.T. – Associazione Italiana Sindrome di Tourette – Milano, Italy
- Direttivo SINPIA – Società Italiana di Neuropsichiatria Infantile – Milano, Italy
- Comune di Sesto San Giovanni – Sesto San Giovanni, (MI) Italy
