= Frédéric Boyer =

French writer (born 1961)

Frédéric Boyer (born 2 March 1961) is a French author of novels, poems, essays, and translations.

== Biography ==
Boyer was born in Cannes. A former student of the École normale supérieure de Fontenay Saint-Cloud, he coordinated the Bible Nouvelle Traduction (Bayard, 2001), with Olivier Cadiot, Jean Echenoz, Florence Delay, Jacques Roubaud, and others. He proposed new translations of the Confessions by Augustine of Hippo for which he was awarded the Prix Jules Janin of the Académie française (Les aveux, P.O.L., 2008) as well as Richard II, P.O.L 2010 and Shakespeare's sonnets, P.O.L., 2010). He is published by Éditions P.O.L..

Boyer is currently the literary director of Éditions P.O.L. He assumed this position in 2018 after the death of the publishing house's founding editor, Paul Otchakovsky-Laurens.

== Works ==
- 1991: La Consolation
- 1992: En prison
- 1993: Des choses idiotes et douces, Prix du Livre Inter
- 1993: Comprendre et compatir
- 1994: Comme des anges
- 1995: Le dieu qui était mort si jeune
- 1995: Est-ce que tu m'aimes ?
- 1995: Les Innocents
- 1995: L'ennemi d'amour
- 1996: Arrière, fantômes !
- 1996: Dieu, le sexe et nous
- 1997: Notre faute
- 1998: Le Vertige des blondes
- 1999: Le Goût du suicide lent
- 1999: Pas aimée
- 2000: Kids
- 2000: Une fée
- 2002: Gagmen
- 2002: La Bible, notre exil
- 2003: Songs
- 2003: Mauvais vivants
- 2004: Mes amis mes amis
- 2004: « Nous nous aimons »
- 2005: Abraham remix
- 2006: Patraque
- 2008: Vaches
- 2009: Orphée
- 2009: Hammurabi Hammurabi
- 2010: Techniques de l'amour
- 2012: Phèdre les oiseaux
- 2013: Rappeler Roland
- 2014: Dans ma prairie
- 2015: Quelle terreur en nous ne veut pas finir ?
- 2015: Kâmasûtra
- 2016: Les Yeux noirs
- 2017: Là où le coeur attend
- 2018: peut-être pas immortelle
- 2020: Sous l'éclat des flèches
- 2020: Jésus : l'histoire d'une parole (Illustrated by Serge Bloch)
