= Paul Fleming =

Paul Fleming may refer to:

- Paul Fleming (footballer) (born 1967), English professional footballer
- Paul Fleming (poet) (1609–1640), German poet
- Paul Fleming (boxer) (born 1988), Australian Olympic boxer
- Paul Fleming (restaurateur), American restaurant financier and developer
- Paul W. Fleming (born 1988), British trade union leader

== See also ==
- Paul Flemming (born 1968), Canadian curler
