= Hans Reinhard =

Hans Reinhard, Hans Reinhardt or Hans Reinhart may refer to:

- Hans von Reinhard (1755–1835), Swiss politician, mayor of Zürich
- Hans Reinhart the Elder (1510–1581), German goldsmith
- Hans Reinhart (poet) (1880–1963), Swiss poet and translator, namesake of the Hans-Reinhart-Ring award
- Hans Reinhardt (politician) (1920–1998), German politician
- Hans-Wolfgang Reinhard (1888–1950), German general

== See also ==
- Georg-Hans Reinhardt (1887–1963), German general and war criminal during World War II
