= Franco Fornari =

Italian psychiatrist & psychoanalyst

- Born: 18 April 1921; Rivergaro, Italy
- Died: 20 May 1985 (aged 64); Milan, Italy
- Citizenship: Italian
- Education: University of Milan
- Spouse: Bianca Fornari
- Children: 5
- Scientific career
- Fields: Psychiatrist

Franco Fornari (Rivergaro, 18 April 1921 - Milan, 20 May 1985) was an Italian psychiatrist, who was influenced by Melanie Klein and Wilfred Bion. He was a professor at the University of Milan, where he was also Dean of Psychiatry and Director of the Psychoanalytic Institute of Literature and Philosophy, and the University of Trento. From 1973 to 1978 he served as president of the Società Psicoanalitica Italiana. He was particularly interested in the psychoanalytic dimensions of war and of the consequences of nuclear armament.

== Biography ==
Fornari was born in Rivergaro (a hamlet about 20 km south of Piacenza), on 18 April 1921 and died in Milan on 20 May 1985. He graduated in Medicine and Surgery and specialized in neuropsychiatry at the University of Milan. He was interested in psychoanalysis and, under the leadership of Cesare Musatti, of whom he was the first student analyst, he became an analyst member of the Italian Psychoanalytic Society and the International Psychoanalytic Society. He also studied with Marguerite Sechehaye in Switzerland.

He married and had five children. His wife, Bianca Fornari, is also a psychoanalyst, as is his daughter, Gigliola Fornari Spoto.

In the Sixties, he became interested in polemology and founded the first "anti-H group" and the Italian Institute of Polemology (ISTIP).

In 1962, he became professor of developmental psychology at the School of Specialization in Psychiatry and Psychology at the University of Milan. In 1968, he obtained the chair of Dynamic Psychology, the first chair of psychoanalysis in Italy, at the Faculty of Sociology of Trento, which, as Fornari affirmed, he also chose because he was "stimulated by being with young people who wanted to engage in social activities." In 1972 he became director of the Institute of Psychology at the University of Milan. From 1973 to 1978, he was president of the Italian Psychoanalytic Society.

He died from a sudden heart attack at his home in Milan in Via Plinio on May 20, 1985 after returning from teaching and preparing to see patients.

== Scientific activities ==
His teaching and research have changed the history of psychology in Italy, breaking the traditional separation that characterized the relationship between psychology and psychoanalysis, and further bridging the divides between experimental and clinical.

Fornari began introducing in Italy the thoughts and the ideas of Melanie Klein. His early writings deepen psychotic dimension both in reference to man's original psychic development, such as La vita affettiva originaria del bambino: 1963 (translation: The original affective life of the child), and to the treatment of schizophrenia and depression, the dynamics of groups and social conflict. His research on these subjects appeared in an essay titled Nuovi orientamenti nella psicoanalisi: 1966 (translation: New directions of Psychoanalysis).

Fornari's Kleinian belief reaches its peak in the specifics of warfare research [Psicoanalisi della guerra atomica: 1964 (translation: Psychoanalysis of the Atomic War); Psicoanalisi della guerra: 1966 (translation: Psychoanalysis of War); Dissacrazione della guerra: 1969 (translation: Desecration of War); Psicoanalisi della situazione atomica: 1970 (translation: Psychoanalysis of the Atomic Situation). In these works, Fornari located the anxieties and psychotic fantasies that govern the behaviour of individuals in groups, and he revealed the ensuing loss of responsibility in various social and political situations. “War – as he says – arises from the outward projection of an internal danger and from denial of death and alienation in an external persecutor, who must be destroyed in order for others to survive.”

The next line of research was sexuality in relation to processes of affective symbolization. In Genitalità e Cultura: 1975 (translation: Genitality and Culture), Fornari reconsiders the concept of perversion, with no culture as antithetical to sexuality, as Freud had argued, but to pregenitality, which would be based on a lack of symbolization of infantile nature and on the primacy of the destructive impulsive behaviour. Though elements of symbolization are already present in the above-mentioned Genitalità e cultura, Fornari directly studied this topic in Simbolo e codice: 1976 (translation: Symbol and Code), I fondamenti di una teoria psicoanalitica del linguaggio:1979 (translation: Foundations of a psychoanalytic theory of language) and Codice vivente: 1981 (translation: Living Code).

In these essays, Fornari also revisited the psychoanalytic theories in cognitive terms, laying the foundations for a true psychoanalytic anthropology, usable by non-psychoanalytic specialists. He resolved the relation between body and mind by positing a code that preserves and transmits information in both directions between body and mind. Such a code, which he called the "living code," is assumed in the programming of affects, which in fact is driven by one's erotic materiality and parental bonds. Fornari developed a "coinemic" theory, in which the minimum unit of affective meaning is the "coineme", which unites affects and the language presiding over the various forms of communication. In fact, Fornari saw this living code as an instrument and methodology that could be used to apply psychoanalysis to a broad range of cultural phenomena: literary texts, speech, music, images and behaviour.

== Fornari and Polemology ==
Franco Fornari dealt specifically with the psychoanalytic aspects of war. According to him, war is an elaboration of the paranoid or projective mourning [Fornari: 1975]. The state plays an unconscious maternal-type role for its citizens. War and violence originate and develop from the need for love, by the desire to preserve and defend the sacred object to which humans are emotionally attached, especially the mother-figure and the merging with her. For adults, nations are sacred objects that generate war. Sacrifice is the essence of war: it translates into the willingness of humans to die for their country by offering their bodies to it. Fornari called war "the spectacular development of a general human situation in which death takes on an absolute value" in the certainty that ideas for which we die are true, and this is why "death becomes a demonstrative process."

== Bibliography of Franco Fornari ==
- 1964 Psicoanalisi della guerra atomica.
- 1968 Principio del piacere e principio di realtà del fenomeno beat.
- 1969 Dissacrazione della guerra: dal pacifismo alla scienza dei conflitti, Sotto gli auspici dell'ISTIP (Istituto Italiano di Polemologia).
- 1969 Angelo a capofitto, Collana: La scala, Milano, Rizzoli.
- 1970 Psicoanalisi della situazione atomica, Collana: Saggi Rizzoli, Milano, Rizzoli.
- 1977 Dalla Traumdeutung all'analisi coinemica, Milano, Unicopli.
- 1977 Il Minotauro: psicoanalisi dell'ideologia, Collana: Saggi Rizzoli, Milano, Rizzoli.
- 1978 Le strutture affettive del significato: ipotesi per una struttura immaginaria del dominio (o del potere), Milano, Libreria Cortina.
- 1979 Nuovi orientamenti nella psicoanalisi, Collana: Biblioteca di psichiatria e di psicologia clinica, 14, Milano, Feltrinelli.
- 1979 I fondamenti di una teoria psicoanalitica del linguaggio, Torino, Boringhieri.
- 1979 Coinema e icona: nuova proposta per la psicoanalisi dell'arte, Collana: La cultura. Biblioteca di scienze dell'uomo, 32, Milano, Il saggiatore.
- 1980 Lezioni introduttive alla lettura della Repubblica di Platone, Collana: Unicopli universitaria, 85, Milano, Unicopli.
- 1981 I sogni delle madri in gravidanza: le strutture affettive del codice materno, Collana: Materiali universitari. Psicologia, 1, Milano, Unicopli.
- 1981 La malattia dell'Europa: saggio di psicopolitica sulla struttura diabolica del potere segreto, Collana: I nuovi testi; 244, Milano, Feltrinelli.
- 1981 Simbolo e codice: dal processo psicoanalitico all'analisi istituzionale, 2a ed, Collana: I fatti e le idee, 324, Milano, Feltrinelli.
- 1981 Il collettivo e le strutture affettive del Principe di Machiavelli, Collana: Materiali universitari. Psicologia, Milano, Unicopli.
- 1982 La vita affettiva originaria del bambino, 11a ed, Collana: Biblioteca di psichiatria e di psicologia clinica, 2, Milano, Feltrinelli.
- 1983 Genitalità e cultura, 4a ed, Collana: Biblioteca di psichiatria e di psicologia clinica, 34, Milano, Feltrinelli.
- 1984 Psicoanalisi della musica, Collana: Il cammeo, 66, Milano, Longanesi.
- 1985 Affetti e cancro, Collana di psicologia clinica e psicoterapia, 10, Milano, Raffaello Cortina Editore.
- 1985 Carmen adorata: psicoanalisi della donna demoniaca, Collana: Il cammeo, 97, Milano, Longanesi.
- 1985 La riscoperta dell'anima, 2a ed, Collana: Biblioteca di cultura moderna, 897, Roma, Bari, Laterza.
- 1987 Seminari al Copernico, Collana: Biblioteca dei Quaderni di psicoterapia infantile, Roma, Edizioni Borla.
- 1988 Psicoanalisi della guerra, 3a ed, Collana: Universale economica, 608, Milano, Feltrinelli.
- 1988 La vita affettiva originaria del bambino, 13a ed. riveduta e ampliata, Collana: Biblioteca di psichiatria e di psicologia clinica, 9, Milano, Feltrinelli.
- 1989 La lezione freudiana: Per una nuova psicoanalisi, 3a ed, Collana: Biblioteca di psichiatria e di psicologia clinica, 74, Milano, Feltrinelli.

== Contributions ==
- 1972 Franco Fornari; et al., La violenza dei cristiani, Collana: Prospettive, Assisi, Cittadella.
- 1974 Franco Fornari, Bianca Fornari, Psicoanalisi e ricerca letteraria, Milano, Principato.
- 1985 Franco Fornari, Laura Frontori, Cristina Riva Crugnola, Psicoanalisi in ospedale: nascita e affetti nell'istituzione, Collana di psicologia clinica e psicoterapia, 9, Milano, Raffaello Cortina Editore.

=== Works of Franco Fornari translated to English ===
- The psychoanalysis of war, New York, Garden City-Anchor, 1974.
- The psychoanalysis of war, New York, Doubleday, 1974.
- The psychoanalysis of war. Bloomington, Indiana University Press, 1975.

=== Works of Franco Fornari translated to French ===
- La psychanalyse de la guerre: la reduction a l'Inconscient du phenomene guerre..., In testa al frontale: Vingt-cinquieme congres des psychanalystes de langues romanes, Paris, Presses Universitaires de France (PUF), 1964, Pagg. 128.
- Sexualité et culture, by Franco Fornari, PUF, 1978. Translated by Robert Maggiori.

=== Research works ===
- Franco Fornari; Franco Basaglia, Graziella Controzzi e Gian Piero Dell'Acqua (a cura di), La violenza, Collana: Documenti e interventi, Firenze, Vallecchi, 1978, Pagg. 104.
- Graziella Magherini (a cura di), Psicoanalisi e cultura di pace: antologia di scritti sulla guerra e la pace, Collana: Uomo planetario, 11, S. Domenico di Fiesole, Cultura della Pace, 1992. ISBN 88-09-00717-4
- Corinna Cristiani (a cura di), Quattro saggi per crescere, Collana: Oggetti ritrovati, 2, Milano, Unicopli, 1997. ISBN 88-400-0451-3
- Ada Burrone, La terapia degli affetti, 1980–1998, Collana: Attivecomeprima, 14, Milano, F. Angeli, 1999.
- Laura Frontori; Irene Ruggiero, La stanza delle parole: ricerca socioanalitica sul mutamento culturale in una istituzione psichiatrica, Presentazione di Franco Fornari; prefazione di Gino Zucchini; collana: Proposte per una nuova societa, 2, Bologna, Patron, 1980.
- Sigmund Freud; William C. Bullitt, Il caso Th. Woodrow Wilson, ventottesimo presidente degli Stati Uniti: uno studio psicologico, Prefazione di Franco Fornari; Collana: I fatti e le idee, 167, trad. di Rosanna Sorani e Raffaele Petrillo, Milano, Feltrinelli, 1967.
- Denis Huisman, Pierre Debray-Ritzen (a cura di), Enciclopedia della psicologia, Titoli originali: Encyclopedie de la psychologie, Milano, Trento Procaccianti, 1972–1983.
- Enciclopedia della psicologia – Volume XII: Psicanalisi e psicologia medica, Prefazione, versione e aggiornamento di Franco Fornari; traduzione di Lucia Sebasti, Milano, Trento Procaccianti, 1983.
- Enciclopedia della psicologia – Volume XIII: Psicanalisi e psicologia medica, Prefazione, versione e aggiornamento di Franco Fornari; traduzione di Lucia Sebasti, Milano, Trento Procaccianti, 1973.
- Enciclopedia della psicologia – Volume XIV: Psicanalisi e psicologia medica, Prefazione, versione, aggiornamento e traduzione di Franco Fornari, Milano, Trento Procaccianti, 1973.
- Calvin S. Hall; Gardner Lindzey, Teorie della personalità, Prefazione di Franco Fornari, Torino, Boringhieri, 1966.
- Giorgio Quintavalle, La comunicazione intrapsichica: saggio di semiotica psicoanalitica, 2a ed, Introduzione di Franco Fornari; collana I fatti e le idee, 408, Milano, Feltrinelli, 1984. ISBN 88-07-22408-9
- Calvin S. Hall; Gardner Lindzey, Teorie della personalità, 2a ed. riveduta e ampliata, Prefazione di Franco Fornari, Torino, Bollati Boringhieri, 1989.
- Sigmund Freud, Il motto di spirito e la sua relazione con l'inconscio, 3a, Introduzione di Franco Fornari; traduzione di Sossio Giametta; collana: Superclassici, Milano, Rizzoli, 1997. ISBN 88-17-15201-3
- Melanie Klein; et al., Franco Fornari (a cura di), Fantasmi, gioco e società, Collana: Il saggiatore studio, 5, Milano, Il saggiatore, 1976.
- Joseph Luft, Introduzione alla dinamica di gruppo, Introduzione di Franco Fornari; trad. di Pier Luigi Bemporad e Margherita Ciacci Berardi; collana: Problemi di psicologia, 38, Firenze, La Nuova Italia, 1973. ISBN 88-221-0739-X

== Bibliography on Franco Fornari ==
- Castelli, M. (2006). Attualità pedagogica del pensiero di Franco Fornari. Innovazione educativa. Mensile di discussione e progettazione di nuovi itinerari formativi, 1, 15–22.
- Hautmann, G. (1988). Rileggendo il miracolo delle noci con Franco Fornari. Il Ponte, 415, 189–194.
- Maggiolini, A. (1988). La teoria dei codici affettivi di F. Fornari. Milano: Unicopli.
- Magherini, G. (1986). L'utopia di Franco Fornari. Testimonianze, 287, 85–95.
- Pietropolli Charmet, G. (1987). La democrazia degli affetti. Formazione psicologica in ospedale generale. Milano: Cortina.
- Pozzoli, B. E. (1989). Il mito nella riflessione psicoanalitica dai primi orientamenti alle teorie di Franco Fornari. Musica e teatro, 7, 15–21.
- Riva Crugnola, C. (1985). Contributo alla biografia e alla bibliografia di Franco Fornari. Teorie e modelli, 2(2), 107–120. Ripubblicat in Cristiani, C. (a cura di) (1997). Quattro saggi per crescere. Milano: Unicopli, pp. 121–136.
- Varin, D. (1984/85). Franco Fornari (1921–1985). Annuario dell'Università degli studi di Milano, 427–428.
