= Karl Kraus =

Karl Kraus may refer to:

- Karl Kraus (writer) (1874–1936), Austrian writer and journalist
- Karl Kraus (physicist) (1938–1988), German theoretical physicist

== See also ==
- Karl Christian Friedrich Krause (1781–1832), German philosopher
- Karl Friedrich Theodor Krause (1797–1868), German anatomist
- Karl Wilhelm Krause (1911–2001), Waffen-SS officer
