= Emotional selection =

Emotional selection refers to:

- Emotional selection (dreaming), the role of emotion in the adaptation of mental schemas through dreams
- Emotional selection (evolution), the role of emotion and personality in natural selection
- Emotional selection (information), the role of emotion in the dissemination and evolution of information
