= Creative evolution =

Creative evolution may refer to:

- Theistic evolution
- Creative Evolution (book), a book by Henri Bergson
