= Henri Bergson =

French philosopher (1859–1941)

- Bergson in 1927
- Born: Henri-Louis Bergson; 18 October 1859; Paris, Second French Empire
- Died: 4 January 1941 (aged 81); Paris, German-occupied France
- Spouse: Louise Neuberger (m. 1891)
- Children: Jeanne
- Awards: Nobel Prize in Literature (1927)

Education
- Education: École Normale Supérieure; University of Paris (Ph.D., 1889)
- Doctoral advisor: Paul Janet

Philosophical work
- Era: 20th-century philosophy
- Region: Western philosophy
- School: Continental philosophy; French spiritualism; philosophy of life; process philosophy
- Institutions: Collège de France
- Doctoral students: Jean Wahl
- Notable students: Émile Bréhier; Jacques Chevalier; Étienne Gilson; Maurice Halbwachs; Vladimir Jankélévitch; Alexandre Koyré; Gabriel Marcel; Jacques Maritain; Roy Wood Sellars
- Main interests: Metaphysics; epistemology; philosophy of language; philosophy of mathematics; studies of immediate experience
- Notable works: Time and Free Will (1889); Matter and Memory (1896); Creative Evolution (1907)
- Notable ideas: Duration; intuition; affection; élan vital; immediate data of consciousness; open society

Henri-Louis Bergson (/ˈbɜːrɡsən, ˈbɛərɡ-/; French: [bɛʁksɔn]; 18 October 1859 – 4 January 1941) was a French philosopher who was influential in the traditions of analytic philosophy and continental philosophy, especially during the first half of the 20th century until the Second World War, but also after 1966 when Gilles Deleuze published Le Bergsonisme.

Bergson is known for his arguments that processes of immediate experience and intuition are more significant than abstract rationalism and science for understanding reality. Bergson was awarded the 1927 Nobel Prize in Literature "in recognition of his rich and vitalizing ideas and the brilliant skill with which they have been presented". In 1930, France awarded him its highest honour, the Grand-Croix de la Legion d'honneur. Bergson's great popularity created a controversy in France, where his views were seen as opposing the "secular and scientific" attitude adopted by the Republic's officials.

== Biography ==
=== Overview ===
Bergson lived the quiet life of a French professor, marked by the publication of his four principal works:

1. in 1889, Time and Free Will (Essai sur les données immédiates de la conscience)
2. in 1896, Matter and Memory (Matière et mémoire)
3. in 1907, Creative Evolution (L'Évolution créatrice)
4. in 1932, The Two Sources of Morality and Religion (Les deux sources de la morale et de la religion)

In 1900, the Collège de France appointed Bergson Chair of Greek and Roman Philosophy, which he remained until 1904. He then replaced Gabriel Tarde as the Chair of Modern Philosophy until 1920. The public attended his open courses in large numbers.

=== Early years ===
Bergson was born in the Rue Lamartine in Paris, not far from the Palais Garnier (the old Paris opera house) in 1859. His father, the composer and pianist Michał Bergson, was of Polish-Jewish background (originally bearing the name Bereksohn). His great-grandmother, Temerl Bergson, was a well-known patroness and benefactor of Polish Jewry, especially those associated with the Hasidic movement. His mother, Katherine Levison, daughter of a Yorkshire doctor, was from an English-Jewish and Irish-Jewish background. The Bereksohns were a famous Jewish entrepreneurial family of Polish descent. Henri Bergson's great-great-grandfather, Szmul Jakubowicz Sonnenberg called Zbytkower, was a prominent banker and a protégé of Stanisław II Augustus, king of Poland from 1764 to 1795.

Bergson's family lived in London for a few years after his birth, and he obtained an early familiarity with the English language from his mother. Before he was nine, his parents settled in France, and Henri became a naturalized French citizen.

Bergson married Louise Neuberger, a cousin of Marcel Proust, in 1891. (Proust served as best man at the wedding.) Henri and Louise Bergson had a daughter, Jeanne, born deaf in 1896. Bergson's sister, Mina Bergson (also known as Moina Mathers), married the English occult author Samuel Liddell MacGregor Mathers, a founder of the Hermetic Order of the Golden Dawn, and the couple later relocated to Paris.

=== Education and career ===
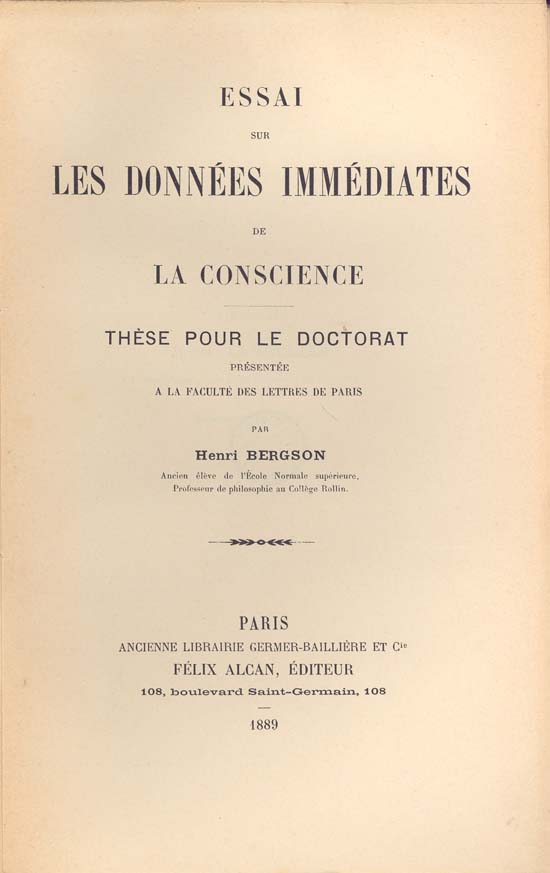
Essai sur les données immédiates de la conscience (dissertation, 1889)

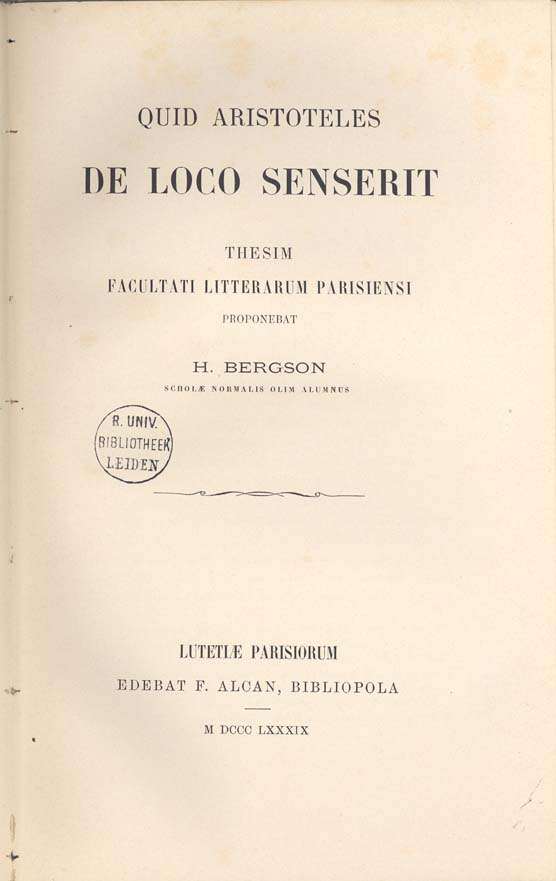
Quid Aristoteles de loco senserit (dissertation, 1889)

Bergson attended the Lycée Fontanes (known as the Lycée Condorcet, 1870–1874 and 1883–present) in Paris from 1868 to 1878. He had previously received a Jewish religious education, but lost his faith between the ages of 14 and 16. According to Hude (1990), this moral crisis is tied to his discovery of the theory of evolution, according to which humanity shares a common ancestry with modern primates, a process construed as needing no creative deity.

At the lycée, Bergson won a prize for his scientific work and another, in 1877, when he was 18, for the solution of a mathematical problem. His solution was published the next year in Nouvelles Annales de Mathématiques. It was his first published work. After some hesitation about whether to pursue the sciences or the humanities, he decided on the latter, to his teachers' dismay. When he was 19, he entered the École Normale Supérieure (during this period, he read Herbert Spencer). He obtained there the degree of licence ès lettres, and then an agrégation de philosophie in 1881 from the University of Paris.

The same year, he received a teaching appointment at the lycée in Angers, the ancient capital of Anjou. Two years later he settled at the Lycée Blaise-Pascal (Clermont-Ferrand) in Clermont-Ferrand, capital of the Puy-de-Dôme département.

The year after his arrival at Clermont-Ferrand, Bergson displayed his ability in the humanities by the publication of an edition of extracts from Lucretius, with a critical study of De Rerum Natura, issued as Extraits de Lucrèce, and of Lucretius's materialist cosmology (1884), repeated editions of which attest to its value in promoting Classics among French youth. While teaching and lecturing in this part of his country (the Auvergne region), Bergson found time for private study and original work. He crafted his dissertation, Time and Free Will (Essai sur les données immédiates de la conscience), along with a short Latin thesis on Aristotle (Quid Aristoteles de loco senserit, "On the Concept of Place in Aristotle") for his doctoral degree, which was awarded by the University of Paris in 1889. The work was published in the same year by Félix Alcan. He also gave courses in Clermont-Ferrand on the Pre-Socratics, in particular Heraclitus.

Bergson dedicated Time and Free Will to Jules Lachelier (1832–1918), then public education minister, a disciple of Félix Ravaisson and the author of On the Foundations of Induction (Du fondement de l'induction, 1871; a work on inductive reasoning). Lachelier endeavoured "to substitute everywhere force for inertia, life for death, and liberty for fatalism". According to Louis de Broglie, Time and Free Will "antedates by forty years the ideas of Niels Bohr and Werner Heisenberg on the physical interpretation of wave mechanics."

Bergson settled again in Paris in 1888, and after teaching for some months at the municipal college, known as the College Rollin, he received an appointment at the Lycée Henri-Quatre, where he remained for eight years. There, he read Darwin and gave a course on his theories. Although Bergson had previously endorsed Lamarckism and its theory of the heritability of acquired characteristics, he came to prefer Darwin's hypothesis of gradual variation, which were more compatible with his continual vision of life.

In 1896, Bergson published his second major work, Matter and Memory. This rather difficult work investigates the function of the brain and undertakes an analysis of perception and memory, leading up to a careful consideration of the relationship of body and mind. Bergson spent years of research in preparation for each of his three large works. This is especially obvious in Matter and Memory, which shows thorough acquaintance with the extensive pathological investigations carried out during the period.

In 1898, Bergson became maître de conférences at his alma mater, École Normale Supérieure, and later that year was promoted to a professorship. The year 1900 saw him installed as a professor at the Collège de France, where he accepted the Chair of Greek and Roman Philosophy in succession to Charles Lévêque.

At the first International Congress of Philosophy, held in Paris during the first five days of August 1900, Bergson read a short paper, "Psychological Origins of the Belief in the Law of Causality" (Sur les origines psychologiques de notre croyance à la loi de causalité). In 1900, Felix Alcan published a work that had previously appeared in the Revue de Paris, Laughter (Le rire), one of the most important of Bergson's minor works. This essay on the meaning of comedy stemmed from a lecture he had given in his early days in Auvergne. The study of it is essential to an understanding of Bergson's views of life, especially its passages dealing with the place of the artistic in life. The paper's main thesis is that laughter is a corrective evolved to make social life possible for human beings. People laugh at those who fail to adapt to society's demands of society if it seems their failure is akin to an inflexible mechanism. Comic authors have exploited this human tendency to laugh in various ways, and what is common to them is the idea that the comic consists in "something mechanical encrusted on the living".

In 1901, the Académie des sciences morales et politiques elected Bergson as a member. In 1903 he contributed to the Revue de métaphysique et de morale an essay, Introduction to Metaphysics (Introduction à la metaphysique), which is useful as a preface to the study of his three large books. He detailed in this essay his philosophical program, realized in the Creative Evolution.

On the death of Gabriel Tarde, the sociologist and philosopher, in 1904, Bergson succeeded him as Chair of Modern Philosophy. From 4 to 8 September of that year, he visited Geneva, attending the Second International Congress of Philosophy, when he lectured on The Mind and Thought: A Philosophical Illusion (Le cerveau et la pensée: une illusion philosophique). An illness prevented his visiting Germany to attend the Third Congress held at Heidelberg. In these years, Bergson strongly influenced Jacques Maritain, perhaps even saving Maritain and his wife Raïssa from suicide.

Bergson's third major work, Creative Evolution, the most widely known and most discussed of his books, appeared in 1907. Pierre Imbart de la Tour remarked that Creative Evolution was a milestone of a new direction in thought. By 1918, Alcan, the publisher, had issued 21 editions, making an average of two editions per annum for ten years. Following the appearance of this book, Bergson's popularity increased enormously, not only in academic circles but among the general public.

At that time, Bergson had already extensively studied biology, including the theory of fecundation (as shown in the first chapter of the Creative Evolution), which had only recently emerged, ca. 1885 – no small feat for a philosopher specializing in the history of philosophy, in particular Greek and Roman philosophy. He also most certainly had read, apart from Darwin, Haeckel, from whom he retained his idea of a unity of life and of the ecological solidarity between all living beings, as well as Hugo de Vries, from whom he quoted his mutation theory of evolution (which he opposed, preferring Darwin's gradualism). He also quoted Charles-Édouard Brown-Séquard, the successor of Claude Bernard at the Chair of Experimental Medicine in the Collège de France.

Bergson served as a juror with Florence Meyer Blumenthal in awarding the Prix Blumenthal, a grant given between 1919 and 1954 to painters, sculptors, decorators, engravers, writers, and musicians.

=== Relationship with James and pragmatism ===
Bergson travelled to London in 1908 and met there with William James, the Harvard University philosopher who was Bergson's senior by 17 years, and who was instrumental in calling Bergson's work to the attention of the Anglo-American public. The two became great friends. James's impression of Bergson is given in his Letters under the date of 4 October 1908:

So modest and unpretending a man but such a genius intellectually! I have the strongest suspicions that the tendency which he has brought to a focus, will end by prevailing, and that the present epoch will be a sort of turning point in the history of philosophy.

As early as 1880, James had contributed an article in French to the periodical La Critique philosophique, of Renouvier and Pillon, titled Le Sentiment de l'effort. Four years later, a couple of articles by him appeared in the journal Mind: "What is an Emotion?" and "On some Omissions of Introspective Psychology". Bergson quoted the first two of these in Time and Free Will. In 1890–91 appeared the two volumes of James's monumental work The Principles of Psychology, in which he refers to a pathological phenomenon Bergson observed. Some writers, taking merely these dates into consideration and overlooking that James's investigations had been proceeding since 1870 (registered from time to time by various articles that culminated in The Principles), have mistakenly dated Bergson's ideas as earlier than James's.

William James hailed Bergson as an ally. In 1903, he wrote:

I have been re-reading Bergson's books, and nothing that I have read for years has so excited and stimulated my thoughts. I am sure that his philosophy has a great future; it breaks through old frameworks and brings things to a solution from which new crystallizations can be reached.

The most noteworthy tributes James paid to Bergson come in the Hibbert Lectures (A Pluralistic Universe), which James gave at Manchester College, Oxford, shortly after meeting Bergson in London. He remarks on the encouragement he gained from Bergson's thought, and refers to his confidence in being "able to lean on Bergson's authority".

Bergson's influence had led James "to renounce the intellectualist method and the current notion that logic is an adequate measure of what can or cannot be". It had induced him, he continued, "to give up logic, squarely and irrevocably" as a method, for he found that "reality, life, experience, concreteness, immediacy, use what word you will, exceeds our logic, overflows, and surrounds it".

These remarks, which appeared in James's book A Pluralistic Universe in 1909, impelled many English and American readers to investigate Bergson's philosophy, but no English translations of Bergson's major work had yet appeared. James encouraged and assisted Arthur Mitchell in preparing an English translation of Creative Evolution. In August 1910, James died. It was his intention, had he lived to see the translation finished, to introduce it to the English reading public by a prefatory note of appreciation. The next year, the translation was completed and still greater interest in Bergson and his work ensued. By coincidence, in that same year (1911), Bergson wrote a 16-page preface, Truth and Reality, to the French translation of James's book Pragmatism. In it, he expressed sympathetic appreciation of James's work, together with certain important reservations.

From 5 to 11 April, Bergson attended the Fourth International Congress of Philosophy held at Bologna, in Italy, where he gave an address on "Philosophical Intuition". In response to invitations he visited England in May of that year and on several subsequent occasions. These visits were well received. His speeches offered new perspectives and elucidated many passages in his three major works: Time and Free Will, Matter and Memory, and Creative Evolution. Although necessarily brief statements, they developed and enriched the ideas in his books and clarified for English audiences the fundamental principles of his philosophy.

=== Lectures on change, popularity and influence ===
In May 1911, Bergson gave two lectures, The Perception of Change (La perception du changement), at the University of Oxford. The Clarendon Press published these in French in the same year. His talks were concise and lucid, leading students and the general reader to his other, longer writings. Oxford later conferred on him the degree of Doctor of Science.

Two days later he delivered the Huxley Lecture at the University of Birmingham, taking for his subject Life and Consciousness. This subsequently appeared in The Hibbert Journal (October 1911), and, revised, is the first essay in the collected volume Mind-Energy (L'Énergie spirituelle). In October he again travelled to England, where he had an enthusiastic reception, and delivered at University College London four lectures on La Nature de l'Âme (The Nature of the Soul).

In 1913, Bergson visited the United States of America at the invitation of Columbia University and lectured in several American cities, where very large audiences welcomed him. In February, at Columbia, he lectured both in French and English, taking as his subjects Spirituality and Freedom and The Method of Philosophy. Being again in England in May of that year, he accepted the presidency of the British Society for Psychical Research, and delivered to it an address, Phantoms of Life and Psychic Research (Fantômes des vivants et recherche psychique).

Meanwhile, his popularity increased, and translations of his work began to appear in a number of languages: English, German, Italian, Danish, Swedish, Hungarian, Polish, and Russian. In 1914 Bergson's countrymen honoured him by his election as a member of the Académie française. He was also made President of the Académie des sciences morales et politiques and became Officier de la Légion d'honneur and Officier de l'Instruction publique.

Bergson found disciples of many types. In France he was responsible for influencing the conversion of Charles Péguy and Jacques Maritain to Catholicism, and found particular reverence among French Catholic philosophers, namely Jean Guitton, Emmanuel Mounier, Pierre Teilhard de Chardin, and Etienne Gilson who described Bergson as "the greatest philosopher she [France] has known since Descartes". Such influence would later extend to Robert Schuman, one of the founding fathers of the European Union.

He would also impact Georges Sorel, who took inspiration from the concept of dynamism and therefrom fashioned his revolutionary syndicalism, a feature which he saw as compatible to the Karl Marx and Pierre-Joseph Proudhon's hostility to the mechanistic positivism of their time, and argued, therefore, that supporters of Marxist socialism should welcome a philosophy such as Bergson's.

While social revolutionaries endeavoured to make the most out of Bergson, his influence among French Catholic intellectuals became divisive as soon as his former disciple, Jacques Maritain, became increasingly unsatisfied with the lack of certainty in Bergson's philosophical oeuvre, and instead found refuge in St. Thomas Aquinas, which Maritain in turn used to develop a full critique of 'Bergsonism'. Maritain therefrom advocated for the placement of Bergson's work within the Index Librorum Prohibitorum under the accusation of implicit pantheism. The Catholic Church eventually placed three of his works in the Index in 1914. Nevertheless his readership and influence among Catholics remained, and Maritain eventually came to praise Bergson upon the publication of The Two Sources.

=== Debate with Albert Einstein ===
In 1922, Bergson's book Durée et simultanéité, à propos de la théorie d'Einstein (Duration and Simultaneity: Bergson and the Einsteinian Universe) was published. Earlier that year, Albert Einstein had come to the French Society of Philosophy and briefly replied to a short speech made by Bergson. It has been alleged that Bergson's knowledge of physics was insufficient and that the book did not follow up contemporary developments on physics. On the other hand, in "Einstein and the Crisis of Reason", a leading French philosopher, Maurice Merleau-Ponty, accused Einstein of failing to grasp Bergson's argument. This argument, Merleau-Ponty says, which concerns not the physics of special relativity but its philosophical foundations, addresses paradoxes caused by popular interpretations and misconceptions about the theory, including Einstein's own. Duration and Simultaneity was not published in the 1951 Edition du Centenaire in French, which contained all of his other works, and was only published later in a work gathering different essays, titled Mélanges. This work took advantage of Bergson's experience at the League of Nations, where he presided from 1920 to 1925 over the International Committee on Intellectual Cooperation (the ancestor of UNESCO, and which included Einstein and Marie Curie).

=== Later years and death ===
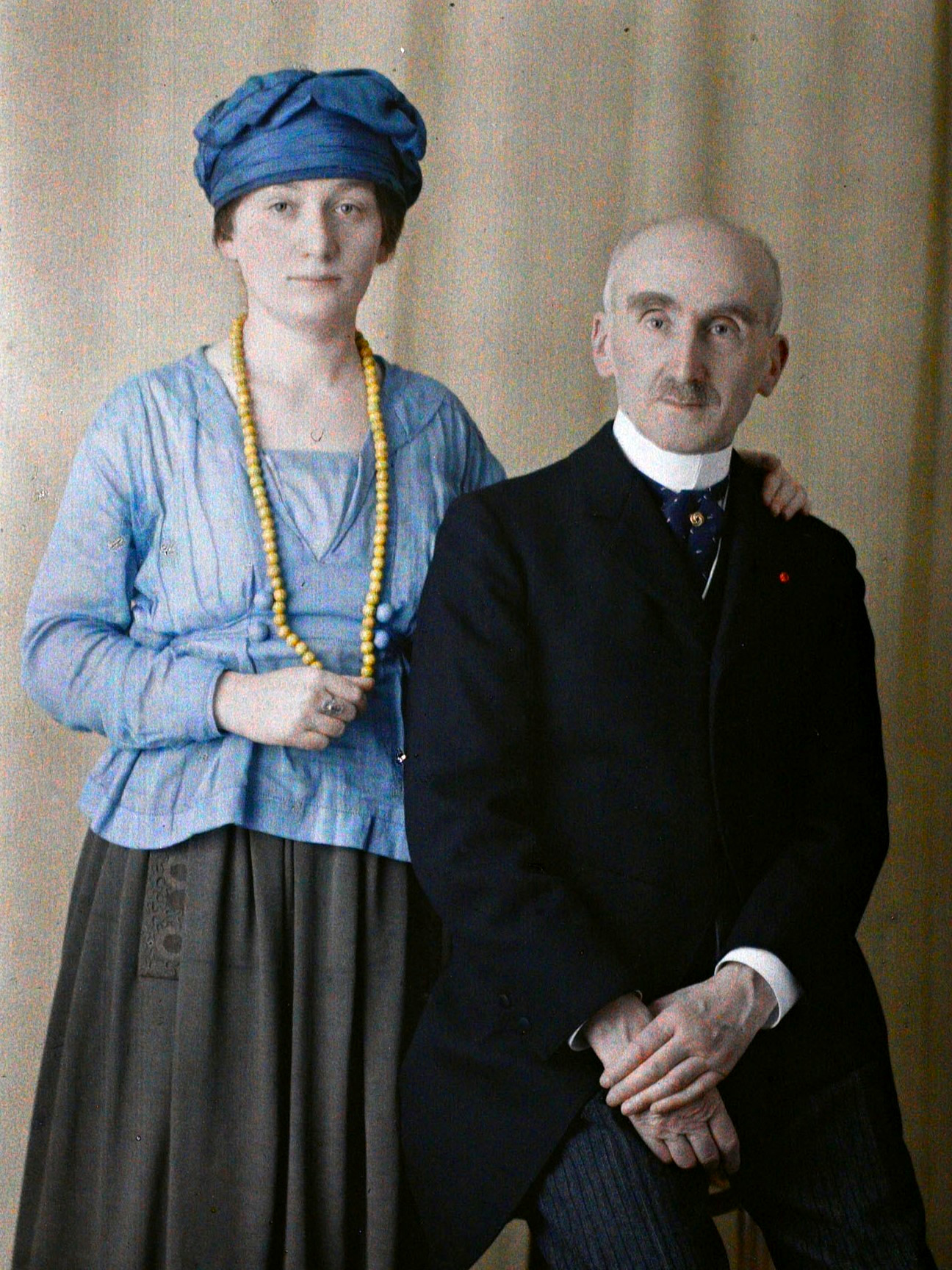
Bergson with his daughter, Jeanne, in 1917. Autochrome by Auguste Léon

In 1914, the Scottish universities arranged for Bergson to give the famous Gifford Lectures, planning one course for the spring and another for the autumn. Bergson delivered the first course, consisting of 11 lectures, under the title The Problem of Personality, at the University of Edinburgh in the spring of that year. The course of lectures planned for the autumn months had to be abandoned because of the outbreak of war.

Bergson was not silent during the conflict, and gave some inspiring addresses. As early as 4 November 1914, he wrote an article, "Wearing and Nonwearing Forces" (La force qui s'use et celle qui ne s'use pas), that appeared in a periodical of the poilus, Le Bulletin des Armées de la République Française. A presidential address, "The Meaning of the War", was delivered in December 1914 to the Académie des sciences morales et politiques.

Bergson contributed also to the publication arranged by The Daily Telegraph in honour of King Albert I of Belgium, King Albert's Book (Christmas, 1914). In 1915, he was succeeded in the office of President of the Académie des sciences morales et politiques by Alexandre Ribot, and then delivered a discourse on "The Evolution of German Imperialism". Meanwhile, he found time to issue at the Minister of Public Instruction's request a brief summary of French philosophy. Bergson did a large amount of traveling and lecturing in America during the war. He participated in the negotiations that led to the entry of the United States into the war. He was there when the French Mission under René Viviani paid a visit in April and May 1917 after America's entry into the conflict. Viviani's book La Mission française en Amérique (1917) has a preface by Bergson.

Early in 1918, the Académie française received Bergson officially when he took his seat among "The Select Forty" as successor to Emile Ollivier (the author of the historical work L'Empire libéral). A session was held in January in his honour at which he delivered an address on Ollivier. In the war, Bergson saw the conflict of Mind and Matter, or rather of Life and Mechanism; and thus showed his philosophy's central idea in action.

As many of Bergson's contributions to French periodicals remained relatively inaccessible, he had them published in two volumes. The first of these was being planned when war broke out. The conclusion of strife was marked by the appearance of a delayed volume in 1919. It bears the title Spiritual Energy: Essays and Lectures (reprinted as Mind-Energy – L'Énergie spirituelle: essais et conférences). The advocate of Bergson's philosophy in England, Wildon Carr, prepared an English translation under the title Mind-Energy. The volume opens with the Huxley Memorial Lecture of 1911, "Life and Consciousness", in a revised and developed form under the title "Consciousness and Life". Signs of Bergson's growing interest in social ethics and in the idea of a future life of personal survival are manifested. The lecture before the Society for Psychical Research is included, as is also the one given in France, L'Âme et le Corps, which contains the substance of the four London lectures on the Soul. The seventh and last article is a reprint of Bergson's famous lecture to the Congress of Philosophy at Geneva in 1904, The Psycho-Physiological Paralogism (Le paralogisme psycho-physiologique), which now appears as Le cerveau et la pensée: une illusion philosophique. Other articles are on the False Recognition, on Dreams, and Intellectual Effort. The volume is a most welcome production and serves to bring together what Bergson wrote on the concept of mental force, and on his view of "tension" and "detension" as applied to the relation of matter and mind.

In June 1920, the University of Cambridge honoured him with the degree of Doctor of Letters. In order that he might devote his full-time to the great new work he was preparing on ethics, religion, and sociology, the Collège de France relieved Bergson of the duties attached to the Chair of Modern Philosophy there. He retained the chair, but no longer delivered lectures, his place being taken by his disciple, the mathematician and philosopher Édouard Le Roy, who supported a conventionalist stance on the foundations of mathematics, which was adopted by Bergson. Le Roy, who also succeeded to Bergson at the Académie française and was a fervent Catholic, extended to revealed truth his conventionalism, leading him to privilege faith, heart and sentiment to dogmas, speculative theology and abstract reasoning. Like Bergson's, his writings were placed on the Index by the Vatican.

While living with his wife and daughter in a modest house in a quiet street near the Porte d'Auteuil in Paris, Bergson won the Nobel Prize for Literature in 1927. Because of serious rheumatic ailments, he could not travel to Stockholm, and sent instead a text subsequently published in La Pensée et le mouvant. He was elected a foreign honorary member of the American Academy of Arts and Sciences in 1928.

After his retirement from the Collège de France, Bergson began to fade into obscurity: he suffered from a degenerative illness (rheumatism, which left him half paralyzed). He completed his new work, The Two Sources of Morality and Religion, which extended his philosophical theories to the realms of morality, religion, and art, in 1932. It was respectfully received by the public and the philosophical community, but by that time Bergson's days as a philosophical luminary were past. He was, however, able to reiterate his core beliefs near the end of his life, by renouncing all the posts and honours previously awarded him rather than accept exemption from the antisemitic laws of the Vichy government.

Bergson inclined to convert to Catholicism, writing in his will on 7 February 1937: "My thinking has always brought me nearer to Catholicism, in which I saw the perfect complement to Judaism." Though wishing to convert to Catholicism, as stated in his will, he did not do so in view of the travails inflicted on the Jewish people by the rise of Nazism and antisemitism in Europe in the 1930s; he did not want to appear to want to leave the persecuted. After the fall of France in 1940, Jews in occupied France were required to register at police stations. When completing his police form, Bergson made the following entry: "Academic. Philosopher. Nobel Prize winner. Jew." It was the position of the Archbishop of Paris, Emmanuel Célestin Suhard, that the public revelation of Bergson's conversion was too dangerous at the time, when the city was occupied by the Nazis, to both the Church and the Jewish population.

On 3 January 1941, Bergson died in occupied Paris of bronchitis. A Roman Catholic priest said prayers at his funeral per his request. Bergson is buried in the Cimetière de Garches, Hauts-de-Seine.

== Philosophy ==
Bergson rejected what he saw as the overly mechanistic predominant view of causality (as expressed in reductionism). He argued that free will must be allowed to unfold in an autonomous and unpredictable fashion. While Kant saw free will as something beyond time and space and therefore ultimately a matter of faith, Bergson attempted to redefine the modern conceptions of time, space, and causality in his concept of duration, making room for a tangible marriage of free will with causality. Seeing duration as a mobile and fluid concept, Bergson argued that one cannot understand duration through "immobile" analysis, but only through experiential, first-person intuition.

=== Creativity ===
Bergson considers the appearance of novelty as a result of pure undetermined creation, instead of as the predetermined result of mechanistic forces. His philosophy emphasizes pure mobility, unforeseeable novelty, creativity and freedom; thus one can characterize his system as a process philosophy. It touches upon such topics as time and identity, free will, perception, change, memory, consciousness, language, the foundation of mathematics and the limits of reason.

Criticizing Kant's theory of knowledge exposed in the Critique of Pure Reason and his conception of truth – which he compares to Plato's conception of truth as its symmetrical inversion (order of nature/order of thought) – Bergson attempted to redefine the relations between science and metaphysics, intelligence and intuition, and insisted on the necessity of increasing thought's possibility through the use of intuition, which, according to him, alone approached a knowledge of the absolute and of real life, understood as pure duration. Because of his (relative) criticism of intelligence, he makes frequent use of images and metaphors in his writings in order to avoid the use of concepts, which (he considers) fail to touch the whole of reality, being only a sort of abstract net thrown on things. For instance, he says in The Creative Evolution (chap. III) that thought in itself would never have thought it possible for the human being to swim, as it cannot deduce swimming from walking. For swimming to be possible, man must throw himself in water, and only then can thought to consider swimming as possible. Intelligence, for Bergson, is a practical faculty rather than a pure speculative faculty, a product of evolution used by man to survive. If metaphysics is to avoid "false problems", it should not extend the abstract concepts of intelligence to pure speculation, but rather use intuition.

The Creative Evolution in particular attempted to think through the continuous creation of life, and explicitly pitted itself against Herbert Spencer's evolutionary philosophy. Spencer had attempted to transpose Charles Darwin's theory of evolution in philosophy and to construct a cosmology based on this theory (Spencer also coined the expression "survival of the fittest"). Bergson disputed what he saw as Spencer's mechanistic philosophy.

Bergson's philosophy of life can be seen as a response to the mechanistic philosophies of his time, but also to the failure of finalism. Indeed, he considers that finalism is unable to explain "duration" and the "continuous creation of life", as it only explains life as the progressive development of an initially determined program – a notion which remains, for example, in the expression of a "genetic program"; such a description of finalism was adopted, for instance, by Leibniz.

Bergson regards planning for the future as impossible since time itself unravels unforeseen possibilities. Indeed, one can always explain a historical event retrospectively by its conditions of possibility. But, in the introduction to the Pensée et le mouvant, he explains that such an event retrospectively created its causes, taking the example of the creation of a work of art, for example a symphony: it was impossible to predict a future symphony as if the composer knew what symphony would be best and wrote it. In his words, the effect created its cause. Henceforth, he attempted to find a third way between mechanism and finalism through the notion of an original impulse, the élan vital, in life, which disperses itself through evolution into contradictory tendencies (he substituted for the finalist notion of a teleological aim the notion of an original impulse).

=== Duration ===
The foundation of Henri Bergson's philosophy, his theory of Duration, he discovered when trying to improve what he saw as the inadequacies of Herbert Spencer's philosophy. Bergson introduced Duration as a theory of time and consciousness in his doctoral thesis Time and Free Will: An Essay on the Immediate Data of Consciousness as a response to another of his influences: Immanuel Kant.

Kant believed that free will could only exist outside of time and space, indeed the only non-determined aspect of private existence in the universe, separate from water cycles, mathematics and mortality. However, it could therefore not be ascertained whether or not it exists, and that it is nothing but a pragmatic faith. Bergson responded that Kant, along with many other philosophers, had confused time with its spatial representation. In reality, Bergson argued, Duration is unextended yet heterogeneous, and so its parts cannot be juxtaposed as a succession of distinct parts, with one causing the other. Based on this he concluded that determinism is an impossibility and free will pure mobility, which is what Bergson identified as being the Duration. For Bergson, reality is composed of change.

=== Intuitionism ===
Duration, as defined by Bergson, then is a unity and a multiplicity, but, being mobile, it cannot be grasped through immobile concepts. Bergson hence argues that one can grasp it only through his method of intuition. Two images from Henri Bergson's An Introduction to Metaphysics may help one to grasp Bergson's term intuition, the limits of concepts, and the ability of intuition to grasp the absolute. The first image is that of a city. Analysis, or the creation of concepts through the divisions of points of view, can only ever offer a model of the city through a construction of photographs taken from every possible point of view, yet it can never produce the dimensional value of walking in the city itself. One can only grasp this through intuition; likewise the experience of reading a line of Homer. One may translate the line and pile commentary upon commentary, but this commentary too shall never grasp the simple dimensional value of experiencing the poem in its originality itself. The method of intuition, then, is that of getting back to the things themselves.

=== Élan vital ===
Élan vital ranks as Bergson's third essential concept, after Duration and intuition. An idea with the goal of explaining evolution, the élan vital first appeared in 1907's Creative Evolution. Bergson portrays élan vital as a kind of vital impetus which explains evolution in a less mechanical and more lively manner, as well as accounting for the creative impulse of mankind. This concept led several authors to characterize Bergson as a supporter of vitalism—although he criticized it explicitly in The Creative Evolution, as he thought, against Driesch and Johannes Reinke (whom he cited) that there is neither "purely internal finality nor clearly cut individuality in nature":

Hereby lies the stumbling block of vitalist theories ... It is thus in vain that one pretends to reduce finality to the individuality of the living being. If there is finality in the world of life, it encompasses the whole of life in one indivisible embrace.

=== Laughter ===
In Laughter: An Essay on the Meaning of the Comic, Bergson develops a theory not of laughter itself but of how laughter can be provoked (see his objection to Delage, published in the 23rd edition of the essay). He describes the process of laughter (refusing to give a conceptual definition which would not approach its reality), used in particular by comics and clowns, as caricature of the mechanistic nature of humans (habits, automatic acts, etc.), one of the two tendencies of life (degradation towards inert matter and mechanism, and continual creation of new forms). However, Bergson warns that laughter's criterion of what should be laughed at is not a moral criterion and that it can in fact cause serious damage to a person's self-esteem. This essay made his opposition to the Cartesian theory of the animal-machine obvious.

== Legacy ==
=== Reception ===
From his first publications, Bergson's philosophy attracted strong criticism from different quarters, although he also became very popular and durably influenced French philosophy. The mathematician Édouard Le Roy became Bergson's main disciple. Nonetheless, Suzanne Guerlac has argued that his institutional position at the Collège de France, delivering lectures to a general audience, may have retarded the systematic reception of his thought: "Bergson achieved enormous popular success in this context, often due to the emotional appeal of his ideas. But he did not have the equivalent of graduate students who might have become rigorous interpreters of his thought. Thus Bergson's philosophy—in principle open and nonsystematic—was easily borrowed piecemeal and altered by enthusiastic admirers".

According to a 2024 article in Daily Nous, in 1910 Bergson was the most cited philosopher in English academic journals, cited more than Aristotle, Kant, or Hegel.

Alfred North Whitehead acknowledged Bergson's influence on his process philosophy in his 1929 Process and Reality. However, Bertrand Russell, Whitehead's collaborator on Principia Mathematica, was not so entranced by Bergson's philosophy. Although acknowledging Bergson's literary skills, Russell saw Bergson's arguments at best as persuasive or emotive speculation but not at all as any worthwhile example of sound reasoning or philosophical insight. The epistemologist Gaston Bachelard explicitly alluded to him in the last pages of his 1938 book The Formation of the Scientific Mind. Others influenced by Bergson include Vladimir Jankélévitch, who wrote a book on him in 1931, Pierre Teilhard de Chardin, and Gilles Deleuze who wrote Le bergsonisme in 1966. The Greek philosopher Helle Lambridis developed an interest in Bergson early in her career, and after two publications in 1929 – a book that introduced Bergson's work to the Greek audience and a translation into Greek of Bergson's book L'Énergie spirituelle (1919) – the second part of her Introduction to Philosophy I & II (1965) included his philosophical work on the concept of 'time', although this part (II) was not published until 2004. Bergson also influenced the phenomenology of Maurice Merleau-Ponty and Emmanuel Levinas, although Merleau-Ponty had reservations about Bergson's philosophy. The Greek author Nikos Kazantzakis studied under Bergson in Paris and his writing and philosophy were profoundly influenced as a result.

Many writers of the early 20th century criticized Bergson's intuitionism, indeterminism, psychologism and interpretation of the scientific impulse. Those who explicitly criticized Bergson, either in published articles or in letters, included Bertrand Russell George Santayana, G. E. Moore, Ludwig Wittgenstein, Martin Heidegger, Julien Benda, T. S. Eliot, Wyndham Lewis, Wallace Stevens (though Stevens also praised him in his work "The Necessary Angel"), Paul Valéry, André Gide, Jean Piaget, Julius Evola, Emil Cioran, Marxist philosophers Theodor W. Adorno, Lucio Colletti, Jean-Paul Sartre, and Georges Politzer, György Lukács as well as Maurice Blanchot, American philosophers such as Irving Babbitt, Arthur Lovejoy, Josiah Royce, The New Realists (Ralph B. Perry, E. B. Holt, and William Pepperell Montague), The Critical Realists (Durant Drake, Roy W. Sellars, C. A. Strong, and A. K. Rogers), Daniel-Henry Kahnweiler, Roger Fry (see his letters), Julian Huxley (in Evolution: The Modern Synthesis) and Virginia Woolf (for the latter, see Ann Banfield, The Phantom Table).

The Vatican accused Bergson of pantheism, while others have characterized his philosophy as a materialist emergentism – Samuel Alexander and C. Lloyd Morgan explicitly claimed Bergson as their forebear. According to Henri Hude (1990, II, p. 142), who supports himself on the whole of Bergson's works as well as his now published courses, accusing him of pantheism is a "counter-sense". Hude alleges that a mystical experience, roughly outlined at the end of Les Deux sources de la morale et de la religion, is the inner principle of his whole philosophy, although this has been contested by other commentators.

Charles Sanders Peirce took strong exception to those who associated him with Bergson. In response to a letter comparing their work, Peirce wrote, "a man who seeks to further science can hardly commit a greater sin than to use the terms of his science without anxious care to use them with strict accuracy; it is not very gratifying to my feelings to be classed along with a Bergson who seems to be doing his utmost to muddle all distinctions." Peirce also comments on Bergson in respect to a proposed book on his semiotics (which he never wrote) saying: "I feel confident the book would make a serious impression much deeper and surer than Bergson's, which I find quite too vague." Gilles Deleuze, however, saw much in common between Bergson's philosophy and that of Peirce - exploring the many connections between them in Cinema 1: The Movement Image and Cinema 2: The Time-Image. As the Deleuze scholar David Deamer writes: Deleuze sets about "aligning Bergson's sensory-motor schema [from Matter and Memory] with the semiosis of Charles Sanders Peirce from Pragmatism and Pragmaticism (1903). William James's students resisted the assimilation of his work to that of Bergson. See, for example, Horace Kallen's book on the subject James and Bergson. As Jean Wahl described the "ultimate disagreement" between James and Bergson in his System of Metaphysics: "for James, the consideration of action is necessary for the definition of truth, according to Bergson, action ... must be kept from our mind if we want to see the truth". Gide even went so far as to say that future historians will overestimate Bergson's influence on art and philosophy just because he was the self-appointed spokesman for "the spirit of the age".

As early as the 1890s, Santayana attacked certain key concepts in Bergson's philosophy, above all his view of the new and the indeterminate:

"the possibility of a new and unaccountable fact appearing at any time," he writes in his book on Hermann Lotze, "does not practically affect the method of investigation; ... the only thing given up is the hope that these hypotheses may ever be adequate to the reality and cover the process of nature without leaving a remainder. This is no great renunciation; for that consummation of science ... is by no one really expected."

According to Santayana and Russell, Bergson projected false claims onto the aspirations of scientific method, claims which Bergson needed to make in order to justify his prior moral commitment to freedom. Russell takes particular exception to Bergson's understanding of number in chapter two of Time and Free Will. According to Russell, Bergson uses an outmoded spatial metaphor ("extended images") to describe the nature of mathematics as well as logic in general. "Bergson only succeeds in making his theory of number plausible by confusing a particular collection with the number of its terms, and this again with number in general", writes Russell.

Suzanne Guerlac has argued that the more recent resurgence of scholarly interest in Bergson is related to the growing influence of his follower Deleuze within continental philosophy: "If there is a return to Bergson today, then, it is largely due to Gilles Deleuze whose own work has etched the contours of the New Bergson. This is not only because Deleuze wrote about Bergson; it is also because Deleuze's own thought is deeply engaged with that of his predecessor, even when Bergson is not explicitly mentioned." Leonard Lawlor and Valentine Moulard agree with Guerlac that "the recent revitalization of Bergsonism ... is almost entirely due to Deleuze." They explain that Bergson's concept of multiplicity "is at the very heart of Deleuze's thought, and duration is the model for all of Deleuze's 'becomings.' The other aspect that attracted Deleuze, which is indeed connected to the first, is Bergson's criticism of the concept of negation in Creative Evolution ... Thus Bergson became a resource in the criticism of the Hegelian dialectic, the negative." It is this aspect that Mark Sinclair focuses upon in Bergson (2020). He writes that despite the philosopher and his philosophy being very popular during the early years of the twentieth century, his ideas had been critiqued and then rejected first by phenomenology, then by existentialism, and finally by post-structuralism. As Sinclair goes on to explain, over series of publications including Bergsonism (1966) and Difference and Repetition (1968), Deleuze championed Bergson as a thinker of "difference that precedes any sense of negation". In this way, "Deleuze's interpretation served to keep the flame of Bergson's philosophy alive and it has been a key motivation for the renewed scholarly attention to it."

Ilya Prigogine acknowledged Bergson's influence at his Nobel Prize reception lecture: "Since my adolescence, I have read many philosophical texts, and I still remember the spell L'Évolution créatrice cast on me. More specifically, I felt that some essential message was embedded, still to be made explicit, in Bergson's remark: 'The more deeply we study the nature of time, the better we understand that duration means invention, creation of forms, continuous elaboration of the absolutely new.'"

Japanese philosopher Yasushi Hirai from Fukuoka University has led a collaborative and interdisciplinary project since 2007, bringing together Eastern and Western philosophers and scientists to discuss and promote Bergson's work. This has influenced the development of specific artificial neural networks which incorporate features inspired by Bergson's philosophy of memory.

In The Matter with Things, Iain McGilchrist extensively cites Bergson. "'Bergson arrived', according to philosopher Peter Gunter, 'at insights closely resembling those of quantum physics.' Only Bergson got there first."

==== Comparison to Indian philosophies ====
Several Hindu authors have found parallels to Hindu philosophy in Bergson's thought. The integrative evolutionism of Sri Aurobindo, an Indian philosopher from the early 20th century, has many similarities to Bergson's philosophy. However, Sri Aurobindo explicitly denied any direct influence, stating that he only read a book on Bergson after his own philosophy had developed and that he "absorbed nothing" from it, deeming Bergson's errors "too evident". While acknowledging that Bergson helped push thought away from rationalism, Sri Aurobindo distinguished his own spiritual "intuition" from Bergson's concept, which he characterized as a "Life Intuition" or "vital instinct" rather than a supramental knowledge. K Narayanaswami Aiyer, a member of the Theosophical Society, published a pamphlet titled "Professor Bergson and the Hindu Vedanta", where he argued that Bergson's ideas on matter, consciousness, and evolution were in agreement with Vedantic and Puranic explanations. Nalini Kanta Brahma, Marie Tudor Garland and Hope Fitz are other authors who have comparatively evaluated Hindu and Bergsonian philosophies, especially in relation to intuition, consciousness and evolution.

== Bibliography ==
- Bergson, H.; The Philosophy of Poetry: The Genius of Lucretius (La Philosophie de la Poesie: le Génie de Lucrèce, 1884), Philosophical Library 1959: ISBN 978-1-4976-7566-7
- Bergson, H.; Time and Free Will: An Essay on the Immediate Data of Consciousness (Essai sur les données immédiates de la conscience, 1889). Allen & Unwin 1910, Dover Publications 2001: ISBN 0-486-41767-0 – Bergson's doctoral dissertation.
- Bergson, H.; Matter and Memory (Matière et mémoire, 1896). Swan Sonnenschein 1911, Zone Books 1990: ISBN 0-942299-05-1, Dover Publications 2004: ISBN 0-486-43415-X.
- Bergson, H.; Laughter: An Essay on the Meaning of the Comic (Le rire, 1900). Green Integer 1998: ISBN 1-892295-02-4, Dover Publications 2005: ISBN 0-486-44380-9.
- Bergson, H.; Creative Evolution (L'Évolution créatrice, 1907). Henry Holt and Company 1911, University Press of America 1983: ISBN 0-8191-3553-4, Dover Publications 1998: ISBN 0-486-40036-0, Kessinger Publishing 2003: ISBN 0-7661-4732-0, Cosimo 2005: ISBN 1-59605-309-7.
- Bergson, H.; Mind-energy (L'Énergie spirituelle, 1919). McMillan 1920. – a collection of essays and lectures. On Archive.org.
- Bergson, H.; Duration and Simultaneity: Bergson and the Einsteinian Universe (Durée et simultanéité, 1922). Clinamen Press Ltd 1999. ISBN 1-903083-01-X.
- Bergson, H.; The Two Sources of Morality and Religion (Les Deux Sources de la Morale et de la Religion, 1932). University of Notre Dame Press 1977. ISBN 0-268-01835-9. On Archive.org.
- Bergson, H.; The Creative Mind: An Introduction to Metaphysics (La Pensée et le mouvant, 1934). Citadel Press 1946: ISBN 0-8065-2326-3 – essay collection, sequel to Mind-Energy, including 1903's "An Introduction to Metaphysics."

== See also ==
- List of Jewish Nobel laureates
- Philosophy of biology
