= Time and Free Will =

1889 doctoral thesis by Henri Bergson

Time and Free Will: An Essay on the Immediate Data of Consciousness (French: Essai sur les données immédiates de la conscience) is Henri Bergson's doctoral thesis, first published in 1889. The essay deals with the problem of free will, which Bergson contends is merely a common confusion among philosophers caused by an illegitimate translation of the unextended into the extended, as a means of introducing his theory of duration, which would become highly influential among continental philosophers in the following century.

== Editions ==
- Henri Bergson, Time and Free Will: An Essay on the Immediate Data of Consciousness, Dover Publications 2001, ISBN 0-486-41767-0.

== See also ==
- Immediate experience
