= Firsthand learning =

Term in education

In pedagogy, firsthand learning means learning from direct experience. The first documented use of the term was by Mark St. John of Inverness Research Associates, in a lecture at the Workshop Center at the City College of New York.

Firsthand learning makes use of a learner's innate curiosity and desire to investigate real phenomena, by providing them with opportunities to learn for themselves using the analytical abilities of their own minds, and connect with the world around them. It involves close engagement with the immediate environment.

Firsthand learning is an inquiry process that generates questions for subsequent investigations. Learners may also record their observations for analysis and interpretation, and communicate the results of this investigative process. Sharing evidence and discussing findings with others makes learning a social process.
