= Emotional selection (evolution) =

Emotional selection is a form of evolutionary selection where decisions are made based primarily on emotional factors.

The German philosopher Ferdinand Fellmann proposed in 2009 emotional selection as a third form of evolutionary selection besides natural and sexual selection. He argued that neither mechanism is sufficient to account for the emergence of human personality or the sense of self. Loving, monogamous pair-bonding seems to be the favored field where sexual selection is being transformed in emotional selection specific for human courtship and mating.

== Overview ==
The concept of emotional selection fits the recent trend of evolutionary psychology which suggests that individual differences are more than the raw material upon which natural selection operates as a homogenizing force. Instead, personality and individual differences are created by "psychosocial selection" in the more intense forms of pair-bonding in primate sociality. Pair-bonds are based on detecting and supporting emotional complexity in partners with whom we maintain long-term intimate intercourse.

Humans are notable among primates in forming emotionally complex pair-bonds; Chimpanzees and Bonobos (the closest living relatives of humans) do not form strong social bonds with reproductive partners, but it is more common with non-relatives. Human pair bonds are often characterised by attachment, trust, euphoria, and sustained commitment, and have been linked to greater life expectancy and better health outcomes. Long-term monogamy across species has also been linked to larger brain size, supporting the hypothesis that the management of complex interpersonal relationships was a significant selection pressure in human cognitive evolution.

== Background ==
Darwin proposed two mechanisms to explain how human behaviour and psychology evolved: natural selection and sexual selection. Natural selection favours traits that enhance survival and produce species-specific adaptations, but it does not account for the degree of individual variation in personality observed within human populations. Sexual selection, which operates through mate choice and intrasexual competition, provides a partial explanation for individual differences. The latter was an attempt to explain phenomena that natural selection could not, such as the degree of morphological and behavioural differences between males and females.

While these frameworks explain many aspects of human biology and behaviour, they have been argued to have limitations in accounting for the extent of variation in human personality and the capacity for sustained emotional attachment. Emotional selection has been proposed to address these gaps. According to Fellmann, emotional traits, such as empathy, attachment, and responsiveness, may have been subject to selection, as individuals who formed stronger and more stable bonds were more likely to reproduce successfully.

== Theoretical Framework ==
=== Emotional Selection and Pair-bonding ===
Pair-bonding refers to the formation of a strong, exclusive, long-term emotional bond between two individuals. Fellmann and Walsh argue that the pair, as a distinct social sub-group, transforms sexual selection by going beyond reproduction to bind partners together emotionally. The evolutionary benefit lies in the emergence of personal identity; such bonds may have also provided advantages in environments where offspring required prolonged care. For early hunter-gatherers, pair-bonds are proposed to have transformed sexual desire into love and commitment, a development considered central to the cultural success of the human species.

Humans experience pair-bonds as committed romantic relationships characterised by attachment, euphoria, trust and comfort. Romantic attachment has been described as functioning as a “commitment device,” focusing attention on a single partner and promoting long-term investment. This is evolutionarily significant given the extended period of dependency in human offspring. Pair-bonding has also been linked to the development of the multilevel organisation of human social groups, with pair-bonded family units forming the foundation of hunter-gatherer bands and other wider communities.

Empirical research suggests that stable pair-bonds are associated with positive health outcomes. For example, married individuals have been found to show lower mortality rates following cancer diagnosis and heart failure and slightly increased life expectancy at older ages. These effects have been partially linked to biological mechanisms such as oxytocin signalling, although causality remains complex and influenced by multiple factors.

=== Personality and Individual Differences ===
Within the social environment of pair-bonded groups, a form of selection pressure distinct from natural and sexual selection emerged, which was termed psychosocial selection. While natural and sexual selection operate through physical competition and mate signalling, psychosocial selection operates through social and emotional complexity. Traits such as the capacity to detect, interpret and respond to a partner’s emotional states and needs became reproductively advantageous, as individuals with greater emotional responsiveness formed stronger bonds and raised more successful offspring. Sympathy and the sense of belonging are identified as foundational to this process, with humans developing these into higher-order emotions.

Supporting evidence from personality psychology demonstrates that the Big Five personality traits reflect evolutionary trade-offs, with no single optimal personality type – different emotional and behavioural profiles grant different advantages across social environments. The breadth of personality variation has also been recognised as one of many explanatory challenges within evolutionary psychology, and emotional selection has been proposed as a framework for addressing it. Empathy, agreeableness and emotional stability have been proposed as products of selection pressure operating within long-term pair-bonds, a claim supported by evidence that personality traits are heritable and associated with reproductive success across diverse human populations.

However, the extent to which personality differences require a distinct evolutionary mechanism remains debated.

== Criticisms ==
=== Distinctiveness from Sexual Selection ===
A major criticism of emotional selection is that it may not constitute a genuinely distinct form of selection. David Buss (2009) argues that personality differences can be accounted for within the existing sexual selection framework through frequency-dependent selection and costly signalling, suggesting that emotional selection as a separate category may be redundant. Nettle and Clegg (2008) similarly demonstrate empirical links between personality traits and mating success within a sexual selection framework, suggesting that emotional and personality traits are already captured by established theory without requiring an additional mechanism. From this perspective, emotional traits are simply part of the broader set of characteristics shaped by mate choice and competition.

=== Evaluation of Emotional Selection ===
In response, Fellmann and Walsh argue that these critiques do not account for the subjective, experiential dimension of human emotion. While sexual selection explains the evolution of physical indicators of mate quality, Fellmann and Walsh argue that it does not explain the emergence of personal identity, self-consciousness, or the capacity for romantic love. Their central argument is that the pair-bond generates forms of emotional experience and personal identity that underpin the cultural and cognitive capacities of the human species. These outcomes cannot be accounted for within competitive mate-choice logic.

However, this distinction remains contested. Critics argue that subjective experiences do not necessarily require a separate evolutionary mechanism, as they may emerge from cognitive processes shaped by natural and sexual selection. In this view, emotional selection risks re-describing existing processes rather than identifying a fundamentally new one.

As a result, the status of emotional selection remains contested. Wider research argues that it does not constitute a separate evolutionary mechanism, but rather reframes processes already explained by natural and sexual selection.
