= Creative Evolution (book) =

1907 book by Henri Bergson

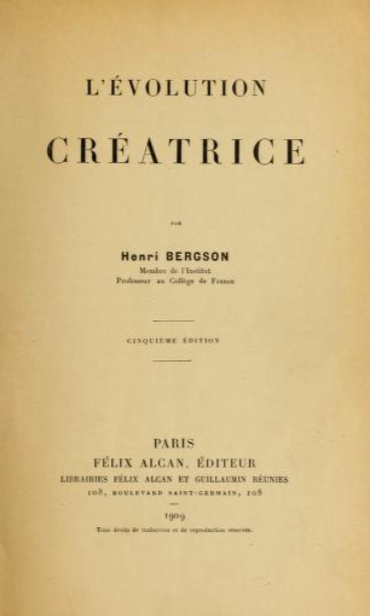
- Title page for L'Évolution créatrice (1909)
- Author: Henri Bergson
- Original title: L'Évolution créatrice
- Translator: Arthur Mitchell
- Language: French
- Genre: Non-fiction
- Publication date: 1907
- Publication place: France
- English publication date: 1911

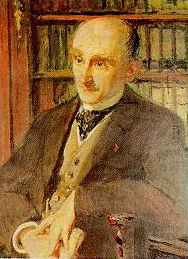
Henri Bergson

Creative Evolution (French: L'Évolution créatrice) is a 1907 book by French philosopher Henri Bergson. Its English translation appeared in 1911. The book proposed a version of orthogenesis in place of Darwin's mechanism of natural selection, suggesting that evolution is motivated by the élan vital, a "vital impetus" that can also be understood as humanity's natural creative impulse. The book was very popular in the early decades of the twentieth century.

The book also developed concepts of time (offered in Bergson's earlier work) which significantly influenced modernist writers and thinkers such as Marcel Proust and Thomas Mann. For example, Bergson's term "duration" refers to a more individual, subjective experience of time, as opposed to mathematical, objectively measurable "clock time." In Creative Evolution, Bergson suggests that the experience of time as "duration" can best be understood through intuition.

According to the translator's note, Harvard philosopher William James intended to write the introduction to the book's English translation, but died in 1910 prior to the completion of the English edition in 1911.

== Editions ==
- Henri Bergson, Creative Evolution (1911) tr. Arthur Mitchell, Henry Holt and Company
- 1944, Modern Library, Random House
- 1998, Dover Publications, ISBN 0-486-40036-0
- 2005, Cosimo Classics, ISBN 0-7607-6548-0

== See also ==
- Emergent evolution
- Homo faber
