= Ferdinand Fellmann =

German philosopher (1939–2019)

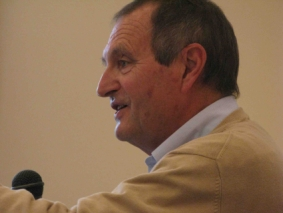
- Born: 14 December 1939; Hirschberg im Riesengebirge, Silesia Province, Germany
- Died: 28 October 2019 (aged 79); Münster, Germany

Education
- Education: University of Münster; University of Pavia

Philosophical work
- Era: Contemporary philosophy
- Region: Western philosophy
- School: Continental philosophy Phenomenology; Hermeneutics; Lebensphilosophie
- Main interests: Philosophical anthropology
- Notable ideas: Symbolic pragmatism (symbolischer Pragmatismus); Imagic turn The couple as erotic justification of man

Ferdinand Fellmann (14 December 1939 – 28 October 2019) was a German philosopher. After the expulsion of his family in 1946 out of Hirschberg (now Jelenia Góra, Poland), Fellmann grew up in Hamelin, Germany.

== Biography ==
Fellmann studied at the University of Münster and the University of Pavia, promoted by the “Studienstiftung des Deutschen Volkes” (German National Merit Foundation). He graduated from his studies in English and Romance Languages and Literature in 1959. From 1962 to 1965 Fellmann continued his studies in Giessen (Germany). He studied there under his most influential professors: Professor of Romance Languages and Literature Hans Robert Jauss, and Professor of Philosophy Hans Blumenberg. Due to the conflict between Jauss, a former SS-Man, and Blumenberg, who was a victim of persecution by the Nazi Regime, Fellmann sought out to find his own way of thinking. In 1967 Fellmann completed his doctorate in Bochum and in 1973 he finished his postdoctoral lecture qualification (“Habilitation”) in Münster. A representation of his relation to Blumenberg can be found in the Journal Information Philosophie (2008, Issue 3, 49–54).

Fellmann was appointed Professor of Philosophy at the University of Münster in 1980. In 1985, he occupied the position of Guest Professor in Naples (Italy) and translated texts of Giordano Bruno, Giambattista Vico, and Benedetto Croce. Later he moved away from historicism and towards systematic themes. In opposition to the dominance of analytic philosophy at the German universities, Fellmann remained devoted to continental (“alteuropäisch”, old European) philosophical tradition. In 1994 he was appointed “Gründungsprofessor” of philosophy at Chemnitz University of Technology, where he worked on synthesizing idealistic and materialistic forms of thought. His concept of philosophy as practical orientation appears in his book entitled Orientierung Philosophie: was sie kann, was sie will [Orientation Philosophy: What It Can Do, What It is Striving to Achieve], first published in 1998. Several of Fellmann's colleagues opposed the book, calling it destructive to academic tradition. After being emeritus professor in 2005, Fellmann served as a visiting professor in Vienna (Austria) and Trento (Italy). He spent the latter years of his life mainly in Münster. As unconventional thinker, he does not belong to any particular philosophical community. In his homepage he ironically referred to himself as the Accademico di nulla accademia, “Academic of no Academy”.

Fellmann died on 28 October 2019, at the age of 79.

== Academic work ==
Fellmann's thought developed from the Philosophy of History to Philosophical Anthropology. Man is always in the focus of his interest, but the perspective is always changing from upside down from the idea of history to bottom up from the human world of life. There are four distinguished phases:

Philosophy of history

Fellmann's entrance into academic discussion followed from the publication of his book, Das Vico-Axiom: Der Mensch macht die Geschichte [The Vico-Axiom: The man makes the history] (1976). Contrary to the influential, idealistic conception of history presented in Hegel's philosophy of spirit, Fellmann interprets Giambattista Vico's The New Science in light of cultural anthropology. Thus, man is the only originator of history, however, he cannot govern the course of history with will or consciousness. Fellmann's conception of history was strongly attacked by the Idealists as well as by the Materialists. For the Idealists, his conception of history was too naturalistic, and the Marxists accused his work of being a “spätbürgerlicher” revisionism. Currently, Fellmann interprets philosophy of history formally as the theory of historical consciousness.

Phenomenology and hermeneutics

In the 1980s Fellmann shifted his focus to the phenomenological account of the theory of consciousness. In Phänomenologie als ästhetische Theorie (1989) he interprets Husserl's teachings of phenomenological ideation (“Wesensschau”) with the example of the photographic snapshot as a case of aesthetic perception of the general in the particular. A further development of Phenomenology as a general media theory by Fellmann is presented in his book Phänomenologie zur Einführung (3. edition 2015). In his theory of mental imagery (“Bildbewusstsein”), Fellmann turns against the popular dogma of the exclusively linguistic construction of the world. In many essays, he works out the logic of the image as an autonomous, symbolic form, located between sign and language. He explains the primate of image consciousness in his book, Symbolischer Pragmatismus: Hermeneutik nach Dilthey (1991), as an "Imagic turn" (different from the current "pictorial turn") — indicating by this term that images possess a magical dimension that cannot be completely resolved in intentionality. In a recent article Hermes und Pandora Fellmann shows how the mythical background still is present in modern hermeneutic philosophy.

Philosophy of life, art of living

Insight into the limitations of the epistemological theory of consciousness led Fellmann after 1990 to a turning point in his thinking towards a modern philosophy of life. In his book Lebensphilosophie. Elemente einer Theorie der Selbsterfahrung (1993) it is clearly recognizable that he does not believe that the destruction of reason forms the core of “Lebensphilosophie”. Rather, he sees that man as a rational being will always have to deal with uncontrollable desires and emotions that frustrate reasonable intentions. These emotions cannot and should not be transformed into reasons, because they offer humans stability and support in behaviour. This approach to Philosophy of life led Fellmann to an ethic with strong utilitarian and hedonistic traits. In Die Angst des Ethiklehrers vor der Klasse. Ist Moral lehrbar? (2000) and in Philosophie der Lebenskunst zur Einführung (2009), he makes clear that practical ethics can only be developed on the foundation of a realistic idea of human life. Fellmann has recently translated a key text of Confucius into German to underpin his view of life through an intercultural perspective.

Philosophical anthropology

Fellmann's philosophical anthropology has found its provisionally definite expression in a widely discussed book Das Paar. Eine erotische Rechtfertigung des Menschen [The Couple: An erotic Justification of Man] (2005). In analogy to the Pauline doctrine of justification (justificatio sola fide), Fellmann interprets justification as an emotional bonding with a loved one that cannot be replaced by rational reasons. In this respect Fellmann's concept of emotional justification opposes the epistemic conception of justification and truth held by Jürgen Habermas. In Fellmann's view epistemic justification of single actions is not sufficient to support man as a being in constant need of justification of his contingent existence. He reconstructs erotic love in terms of genetic phenomenology being the source of self-consciousness, a position that he recently sought out to underpin through socio biology. In his later essays, Fellmann argues that the „eccentric positionality“ of man's self-consciousness is the outcome of his exceptional sexuality, namely the constant erotic susceptibility apart from procreation. His attempt to connect biology and philosophy has been acclaimed. Recently he coined the term "Erosoph" (Erosopher) in analogy to a philosopher who combines Logos with Eros. This neologism has been received positively by a broader public.

Fellmann's philosophical position is outstanding in German academic tradition by his attempt to transform the fundamental questions of metaphysics and ontology into anthropological descriptions and practical devices. His work shows a sound historical knowledge reformulated in the scope of a realistic reconstruction of the human world of life including the various forms of symbolic representation. Thus, he avoids a naturalistic reduction balancing out transcendental idealism and pragmatic realism. The philosopher to whom Fellmann refers in most of his texts is Schopenhauer, the father of modern Philosophy of Life, regarding the world as Will and Representation.

== Publications ==
=== Books ===
- Der Erosoph. Eine philosophische Autobiographie, Würzburg 2019
- The Couple. Intimate Relations in a New Key. Series: Development in Humanities, Wien 2016
- Philosophie der Lebenskunst zur Einführung, Hamburg 2009
- Der Liebes-Code. Schlüssel zur Polarität der Geschlechter, Berlin 2007
- Phänomenologie zur Einführung, Hamburg 2005, 3. ed. 2015
- Das Paar. Eine erotische Rechtfertigung des Menschen, Berlin 2005; 2. ed. Freiburg/München 2014
- Die Angst des Ethiklehrers vor der Klasse. Ist Moral lehrbar?, Stuttgart 2000
- Orientierung Philosophie. Was sie kann, was sie will, 2. edition, Reinbek b. Hamburg 2000
- Geschichte der Philosophie im 19. Jahrhundert, Reinbek b. Hamburg 1996
- Lebensphilosophie. Elemente einer Theorie der Selbsterfahrung, Reinbek b. Hamburg 1993.
- Symbolischer Pragmatismus. Hermeneutik nach Dilthey, Reinbek b. Hamburg 1991
- Phänomenologie als ästhetische Theorie, Freiburg/München 1989
- Gelebte Philosophie in Deutschland. Denkformen der Lebensweltphänomenologie und der kritischen Theorie, Freiburg/ München 1983
- Phänomenologie und Expressionismus, Freiburg/München 1982
- Das Vico-Axiom: Der Mensch macht die Geschichte, Freiburg/München 1976
- Scholastik und kosmologische Reform, Münster 1971, 2. ed. 1988

=== Articles ===
- Fellmann, Ferdinand. 2018. "Well-Being East and West." Open Journal of Social Sciences, 6, 84–93.
- Fellmann, Ferdinand, and Esther Redolfi. 2017. "Aspects of Sex differences: Social Intelligence vs. Creative Intelligence." Advances in Anthropology,7 (4), 298–317.
- Fellmann, Ferdinand. 2017. "From Social Psychology to Cultural Psychology: The Redemption of Personality." Psychology,8 (10), 1586–1600.
- Fellmann, Ferdinand. 2017. "Memory and the Timeless Time of Eros." Psychology,8 (7), 963–977.
- Fellmann, Ferdinand, and Rebecca Walsh. 2016. "From Sexuality to Eroticism: The Making of the Human Mind." Advances in Anthropology,6 (1), 11–24.
- Fellmann, Ferdinand, and Rebecca Walsh. 2013. "Emotional Selection and Human Personality." Biological Theory,8 (1), 64–73.
- Fellmann, Ferdinand. 2010. "The Origin of Man Behind the Veil of Ignorance: A Psychobiological Approach." Biological Theory,5 (3), 240–245.
