= Intuition (Bergson) =

Philosophical method of Henri Bergson

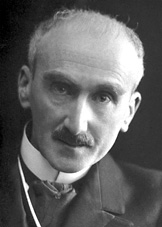
Henri Bergson in 1927.

Intuition is the philosophical method of French philosopher Henri Bergson.

In An Introduction to Metaphysics, Bergson introduces two ways in which an object can be known: absolutely and relatively. Pertaining to each mode of knowledge is a method through which it can be gained. The latter’s method is what Bergson calls analysis, while the method of intuition belongs to the former.

Intuition is an experience of sorts, which allows us to in a sense enter into the things in themselves. Thus he calls his philosophy the true empiricism. In the following article, analysis and the relative will be explained as a preliminary to understanding intuition, and then intuition and the absolute will be expounded upon.

== Analysis and the Relative ==
Analysis is always an analysis ad infinitum and one can never reach the absolute. It consists in dividing the object based on the chosen viewpoint and translating the divided fragments into symbols, wherein a spectre of the original can be reconstructed. These symbols always distort the part of the object they represent, as they’re generalized to include it and every other part they represent. Thus they ignore the object’s uniqueness.

This is natural, however, as language is the product of commonsense, which is never disinterested. Thus, for example, mobility is translated into a trajectory line and treated as a row of divisible, immobile points. Symbols are generally always spatial and immobile. This allows science to be predictive and our actions to assert themselves on fixed points.

Within philosophy, however, problems arise when the symbols are treated as the objects they represent and when, through composition, the original is expected to be found within the simulacrum. An example of this is the substance theory of rationalists and the bundle theory of empiricists. Empiricists, searching for the substance within the gaps of the composition, fill them in within even more symbols. Unwilling to continue filling in the gaps ad infinitum, they renounce that there is a substance and maintain the properties, or symbols, which are not to be confused with parts, are all that there are. The rationalists, on the other hand, are unwilling to relinquish substance. Thus they transform it into an unknowable container in which properties reside. Trying to obtain the unity of the object, they allow their substance to contain more and more properties, until eventually it can contain everything, including God and nature. Bergson likened this to a piece of gold for which one can never make up the change.

== Intuition and the Absolute ==
Henri Bergson defined metaphysics as the science that dispenses with symbols to grasp the absolute. Hence metaphysics involves an inversion of the habitual modes of thought and is in need of its own method, which he identified as intuition.

Henri Bergson defined intuition as a simple, indivisible experience of sympathy through which one is moved into the inner being of an object to grasp what is unique and ineffable within it. The absolute that is grasped is always perfect in the sense that it is perfectly what it is, and infinite in the sense that it can be grasped as a whole through a simple, indivisible act of intuition, yet lends itself to boundless enumeration when analysed. (Note: For a Whiteheadian use of Bergsonian intuition, see Michel Weber's Whitehead’s Pancreativism. The Basics. Foreword by Nicholas Rescher, Frankfurt / Paris, Ontos Verlag, 2006.)

Two images Henri Bergson gave in his essay An Introduction to Metaphysics may aid us in comprehending the ideas of intuition, analyses, the absolute and the relative. The first image is a city reconstructed with juxtaposed photographs taken from every viewpoint and angle. The reconstruction can never give us the dimensional value of walking through the actual city. This can only ever be grasped through a simple intuition. The same goes for the experience of reading a single line of Homer. If you wish to explain this experience to someone who cannot speak ancient Greek, you may translate the line and lay commentary upon commentary, but this commentary shall never grasp the dimensional value of experiencing the poem in its original language.

It can be seen then that intuition is a method that aims at getting back to and knowing the things themselves, in all their uniqueness and ineffable originality. The one thing it is certain one can grasp from within through sympathy is the self. Intuition therefore begins with placing oneself within the Duration.

From within the Duration, one may augment it to contain other Durations one can enter into. Like an infinite spectrum of shades gradually running into one another, one finds themselves within orange, stuck between its darkest and lightest shades. One may move up to yellow or down to red, just as one may move up to spirit or down to matter.

The method then consists in placing oneself within the Duration, which always contains a sense of all the other Durations within the absolute Duration. From here, one should expand their Duration into a continuous heterogeneity. Once this is done, one differentiates two extremities within the Duration to create a dualism, just as one differentiates between red and yellow within the colour spectrum, before showing they are in fact one.

It may now be understood that Henri Bergson was dissatisfied with Kantianism, which limited the bounds of reason to such an extent that it deemed knowledge of the absolute an impossibility. His method of intuition can in fact be seen as a response to Immanuel Kant, who believed that we can only know the world as it appears to us, not as it is in itself. He maintained that the attempt to know the absolute always resulted in antinomies, a kind of philosophical paradox caused by the limits of reason.

Bergson responds by saying that the antinomies are the result of analysis, not intuition. An example of this is Duration itself, which Bergson maintains isn’t a multiplicity or a unity. Depending on the viewpoint from which one begins, he will either reconstruct the absolute Duration as a unity or a multiplicity. Hence the antinomy of substance pluralism and substance monism, which can only be resolved through showing they are two representations of the same thing via a simple act of intuition. Thus real philosophy consists in placing oneself above the fray of oppositional schools of thought.
