= Duration (philosophy) =

Theory of time and consciousness posited by the French philosopher Henri Bergson

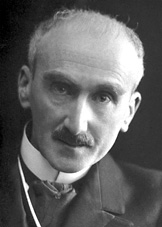
Henri Bergson in 1927.

Duration (French: la durée) is a theory of time and consciousness posited by the French philosopher Henri Bergson. Bergson sought to improve upon inadequacies he perceived in the philosophy of Herbert Spencer, due, he believed, to Spencer's lack of comprehension of mechanics, which led Bergson to the conclusion that time eluded mathematics and science. Bergson became aware that the moment one attempted to measure a moment, it would be gone: one measures an immobile, complete line, whereas time is mobile and incomplete. For the individual, time may speed up or slow down, whereas, for science, it would remain the same. Hence Bergson decided to explore the inner life of man, which is a kind of duration, neither a unity nor a quantitative multiplicity. Duration is ineffable and can only be shown indirectly through images that can never reveal a complete picture. It can only be grasped through a simple intuition of the imagination.

Bergson first introduced his notion of duration in his essay Time and Free Will: An Essay on the Immediate Data of Consciousness. It is used as a defense of free will in a response to Immanuel Kant, who believed free will was only possible outside time and space.

== Responses to Kant and Zeno ==
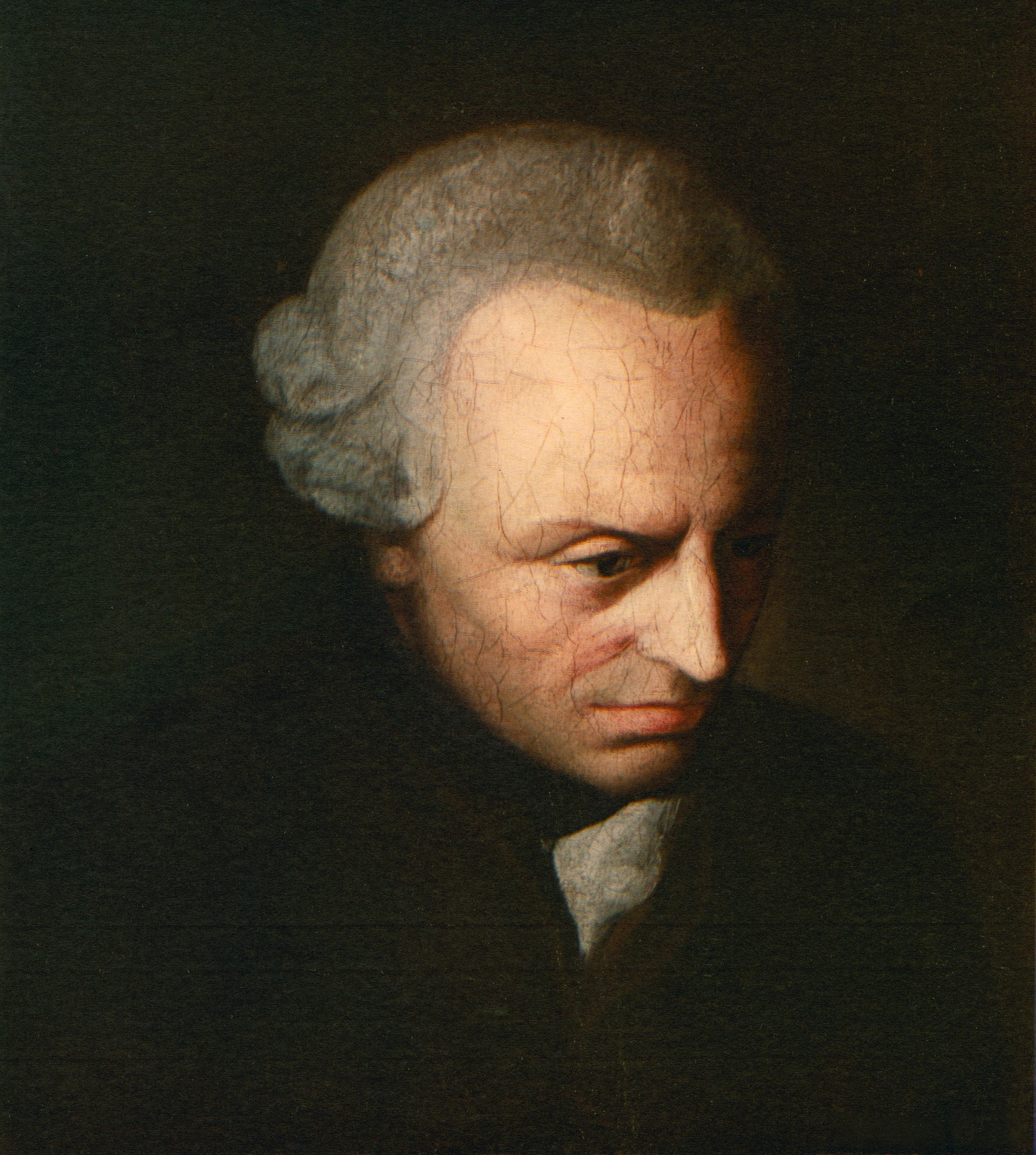
Immanuel Kant, who believed free will was only a pragmatic belief.

Zeno of Elea believed reality was an uncreated and indestructible immobile whole. He formulated four paradoxes to present mobility as an impossibility. We can never, he said, move past a single point because each point is infinitely divisible, and it is impossible to cross an infinite space. But to Bergson, the problem only arises when mobility and time, that is, duration, are mistaken for the spatial line that underlies them. Time and mobility are mistakenly treated as things, not progressions. They are treated retrospectively as a thing's spatial trajectory, which can be divided ad infinitum, whereas they are, in fact, an indivisible whole.

Bergson's response to Kant is that free will is possible within a duration within which time resides. Free will is not really a problem but merely a common confusion among philosophers caused by the immobile time of science. To measure duration (durée), it must be translated into the immobile, spatial time (temps) of science, a translation of the unextended into the extended. It is through this translation that the problem of free will arises. Since space is a homogeneous, quantitative multiplicity, as opposed to what Bergson calls a heterogenous, qualitative multiplicity, duration becomes juxtaposed and converted into a succession of distinct parts, one coming after the other and therefore "caused" by one another. Nothing within a duration can be the cause of anything else within it. Hence determinism, the belief everything is determined by a prior cause, is an impossibility. One must accept time as it really is through placing oneself within duration where freedom can be identified and experienced as pure mobility.

== Images of duration ==
The first is of two spools, one unrolling to represent the continuous flow of ageing as one feels oneself moving toward the end of one's life-span, the other rolling up to represent the continuous growth of memory which, for Bergson, equals consciousness. No two successive moments are identical, for the one will always contain the memory left by the other. A person with no memory might experience two identical moments but, Bergson says, that person's consciousness would thus be in a constant state of death and rebirth, which he identifies with unconsciousness. The image of two spools, however, is of a homogeneous and commensurable thread, whereas, according to Bergson, no two moments can be the same, hence duration is heterogeneous.

Bergson then presents the image of a spectrum of a thousand gradually changing shades with a line of feeling running through them, being both affected by and maintaining each of the shades. Yet even this image is inaccurate and incomplete, for it represents duration as a fixed and complete spectrum with all the shades spatially juxtaposed, whereas duration is incomplete and continuously growing, its states not beginning or ending but intermingling.

Instead, let us imagine an infinitely small piece of elastic, contracted, if that were possible, to a mathematical point. Let us draw it out gradually in such a way as to bring out of the point a line which will grow progressively longer. Let us fix our attention not on the line as line, but on the action which traces it. Let us consider that this action, in spite of its duration, is indivisible if one supposes that it goes on without stopping; that, if we intercalate a stop in it, we make two actions of it instead of one and that each of these actions will then be the indivisible of which we speak; that it is not the moving act itself which is never indivisible, but the motionless line it lays down beneath it like a track in space. Let us take our mind off the space subtending the movement and concentrate solely on the movement itself, on the act of tension or extension, in short, on pure mobility. This time we shall have a more exact image of our development in duration.

— Henri Bergson, The Creative Mind: An Introduction to Metaphysics, pages 164 to 165.

Even this image is incomplete, because the wealth of colouring is forgotten when it is invoked. But as the three images illustrate, it can be stated that duration is qualitative, unextended, multiple yet a unity, mobile and continuously interpenetrating itself. Yet these concepts put side-by-side can never adequately represent duration itself;

The truth is we change without ceasing...there is no essential difference between passing from one state to another and persisting in the same state. If the state which "remains the same" is more varied than we think, [then] on the other hand the passing of one state to another resembles—more than we imagine—a single state being prolonged: the transition is continuous. Just because we close our eyes to the unceasing variation of every physical state, we are obliged when the change has become so formidable as to force itself on our attention, to speak as if a new state were placed alongside the previous one. Of this new state we assume that it remains unvarying in its turn and so on endlessly.

Because a qualitative multiplicity is heterogeneous and yet interpenetrating, it cannot be adequately represented by a symbol; indeed, for Bergson, a qualitative multiplicity is inexpressible. Thus, to grasp duration, one must reverse habitual modes of thought and place oneself within duration by intuition.

== Influence on Gilles Deleuze ==
Gilles Deleuze was profoundly influenced by Bergson's theory of duration, particularly in his work Cinema 1: The Movement Image in which he described cinema as providing people with continuity of movement (duration) rather than still images strewn together.

== Physics and Bergson's ideas ==
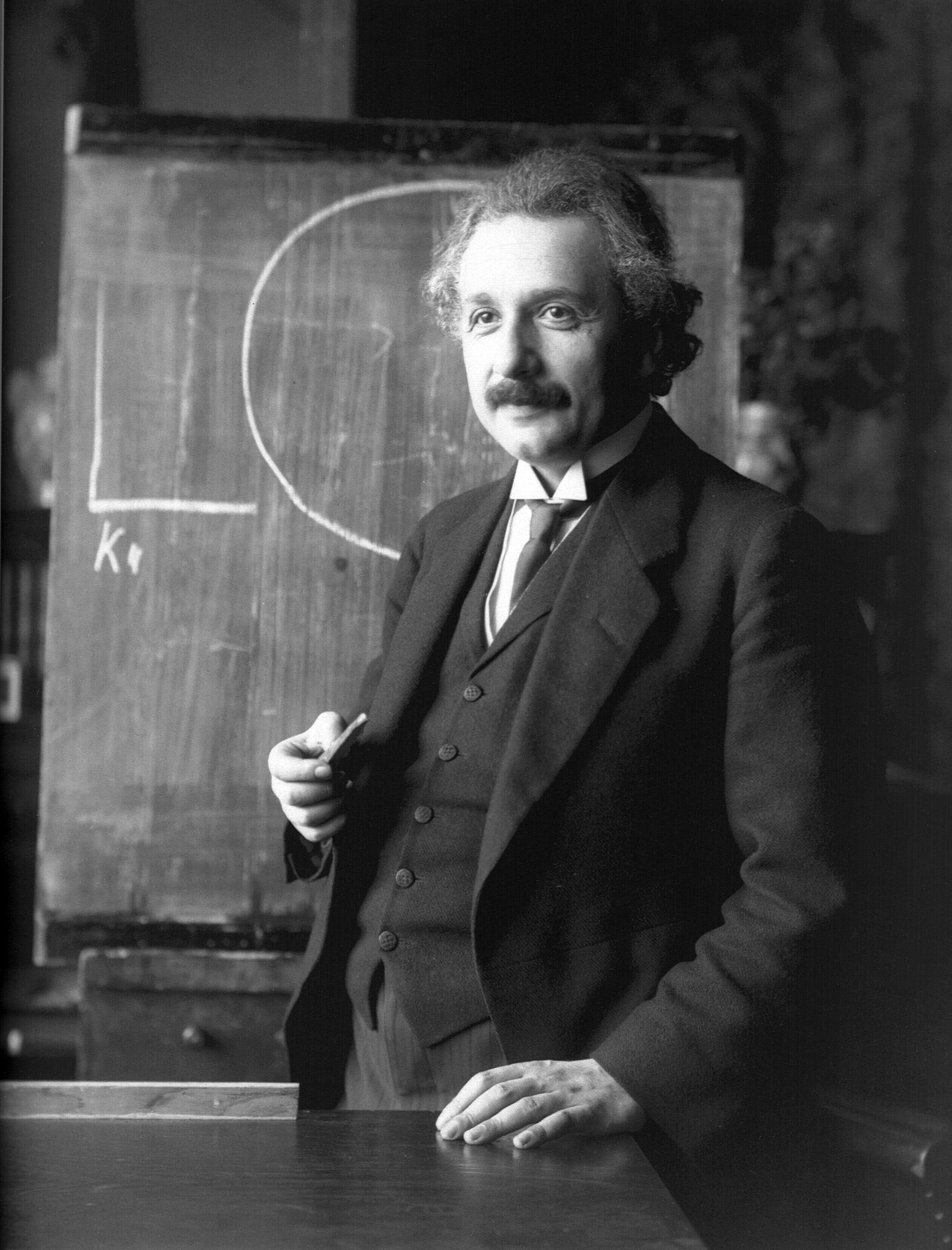
Albert Einstein in 1921

Bergson had a correspondence with physicist Albert Einstein in 1922 and a debate over Einstein's theory of relativity and its implications. For Bergson, the primary disagreement was over metaphysical and epistemological claims made by the theory of relativity, rather than a dispute about scientific evidence for or against the theory. Bergson famously stated of the theory that it is "a metaphysics grafted upon science, it is not science".

== See also ==
- Loop quantum gravity
- Problem of time
- Specious present
- Uncertainty principle
