= Élan vital =

Hypothetical explanation for evolution and development of organisms

Élan vital (French pronunciation: [elɑ̃ vital]) is a term coined by French philosopher Henri Bergson in his 1907 book Creative Evolution, in which he addresses the question of self-organisation and spontaneous morphogenesis of things in an increasingly complex manner. Élan vital was translated in the English edition as "vital impetus", but is usually translated by his detractors as "vital force". It is a hypothetical explanation for evolution and development of organisms, which Bergson linked closely with consciousness – the intuitive perception of experience and the flow of inner time.

== Precursors ==
Distant anticipations of Bergson can be found in the work of the pre-Christian Stoic philosopher Posidonius, who postulated a "vital force" emanated by the sun to all living creatures on the Earth's surface, and in that of Zeno of Elea. The concept of élan vital is also similar to Baruch Spinoza's concept of conatus as well as Arthur Schopenhauer's concept of the will-to-live and the Sanskrit āyus or "life principle".

== Influence ==
The French philosopher Gilles Deleuze attempted to recoup the novelty of Bergson's idea in his book Bergsonism, though Deleuze substantially modified the meaning of the term. No longer considered a mystical, elusive force acting on brute matter, as it was in the vitalist debates of the late 19th century, élan vital denotes for Deleuze an internal force, a substance in which the distinction between organic and inorganic matter vanishes, and the emergence of life cannot be discerned.

In 1912 Beatrice M. Hinkle wrote that Carl Gustav Jung's conception of libido was similar to Bergson's élan vital.

The notion of élan vital had considerable influence on the psychiatrist and phenomenologist Eugène Minkowski and his own concept of a personal élan – the element which keeps us in touch with a feeling of life.

== Criticism ==
The consensus of geneticists is that they see no "life force" other than the organisational matrix contained in the genes themselves, according to R.F. Weir.

The British secular humanist biologist Julian Huxley dryly remarked that Bergson's élan vital is no better an explanation of life than is explaining the operation of a railway engine by its élan locomotif ("locomotive driving force"). The same alleged epistemological fallacy is parodied in Molière's Le Malade imaginaire, in which the quack doctor explains why opium causes sleep: "Because of its soporific power." However, Huxley used the term élan vital in a more metaphorical sense:

When I was just last in New York, I went for a walk, leaving Fifth Avenue and the Business section behind me, into the crowded streets near the Bowery. And while I was there, I had a sudden feeling of relief and confidence. There was Bergson's élan vital—there was assimilation causing life to exert as much pressure, though embodied here in the shape of men, as it has ever done in the earliest year of evolution: there was the driving force of progress

— lecture 1, n.p.

The author and popular Christian theologian C. S. Lewis rejected Bergson's concept in his essay The Weight of Glory stating "...even if all the happiness they promised could come to man on earth, yet still each generation would lose it by death, including the last generation of all, and the whole story would be nothing, not even a story, for ever and ever. Hence all the nonsense that Mr. Shaw puts into the final speech of Lilith, and Bergson's remark that the élan vital is capable of surmounting all obstacles, perhaps even death—as if we could believe that any social or biological development on this planet will delay the senility of the sun or reverse the second law of thermodynamics."

== See also ==
- Conatus
- Emergence
- Joie de vivre
- Hylozoism
- Orthogenesis
- Parable of the Invisible Gardener
- Vis viva
