= Matter and Memory =

1896 book by Henri Bergson

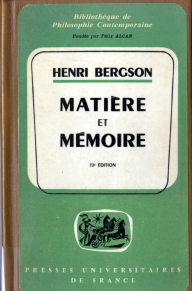
Cover from a 1965 French language edition

Matter and Memory (French: Matière et mémoire) is a 1896 book by the French philosopher Henri Bergson. Its subtitle is Essay on the relation of body and spirit (Essai sur la relation du corps à l’esprit), and the work presents an analysis of the classical philosophical problems concerning this relation. Within that frame, the analysis of memory serves the purpose of clarifying the problem.

Matter and Memory was written in reaction to the book The Maladies of Memory by Théodule Ribot, which appeared in 1881. Ribot claimed that the findings of brain science proved that memory is lodged within a particular part of the nervous system; localized within the brain and thus being of a material nature. Bergson was opposed to this reduction of spirit to matter. Defending a clear anti-reductionist position, he considered memory to be of a deeply spiritual nature, the brain serving the need of orienting present action by inserting relevant memories. The brain thus being of a practical nature, certain lesions tend to perturb this practical function, but without erasing memory as such. The memories are, instead, simply not 'incarnated,' and cannot serve their purpose.

== Various forms of memory ==
Bergson distinguishes between two different forms of memory.

1. The first category consists of memories concerning habitude, replaying and repeating past action — not strictly recognized as representing the past, but utilizing it for the purpose of present action. This kind of memory is automatic, inscribed within the body, and serves a utilitarian purpose. Bergson takes as an example the learning of a verse by rote — i.e., a recitation tending toward non-reflective and mechanical repetition. The duration of habitual recitation tends toward the regular, and one may compare this kind of memory to practical knowledge or habit. "It is habitude clarified by memory, more than memory itself strictly speaking."
2. Pure memory, on the other hand, registers the past in the form of "image-remembrance," representing the past, recognized as such. It is of a contemplative and fundamentally spiritual kind, and it is free. This is true memory. Bergson takes as his example the remembrance of the lesson of learning the same verse — i.e., a dated fact that cannot be recreated. Pure memory or remembrance permits the acknowledgment that the lesson has been learned in the past, cannot be repeated, and is not internal to the body.

== Metaphysical consequences ==
Bergson accused classical metaphysics of misrepresenting its assumed problems, and of being guilty of posing secondary problems as being principal. The problem posed by Bergson was thus well known, but he redefined the way of posing it. Each of his four main works follows the same principle — responding to a precisely posed problem; in Matter and Memory, Descartes's problem of spirit and body — stated as being two substances with different attributes. Descartes's fault lies in defining matter and memory as substances or res, thus not separating them distinctly.

Bergson really does distinguish the spirit from the body, but as opposed to in Descartes's classical philosophy, the distinction resides in the temporal domain, not in the spatial. The spirit is the abode of the past; the body of the present; the soul or spirit always anchored in the past, not residing in the present; lodged in the past, and contemplating the present. To have or take consciousness of anything, means looking at it from the viewpoint of the past, in light of the past. Contenting oneself with reacting to an external stimulus means being unconscious of the act; an existence within the sheer presence of the body. Consciousness means, invariably, delaying reaction to stimuli; the interval accompanied by the conscious awareness that the spirit is anchored within the past. One becomes conscious while being anchored in the past, in light of the past, in view of appropriate action directed towards the immediate future. The articulation of time — past, present, future — finds place through the union of spirit and body. The more the spirit descends into the past, the more one becomes conscious. The more one acts automatically, the more one exists in the present, in the temporal domain of the body. And one always stays within one domain or the other. True awareness necessitates the united action of body and spirit. According to Bergson, the "impulsive person" suspends his consciousness and stays within the unreflective domain of automatism.

== The role of affection ==
Bergson contended that we do not know our bodies only "from without" by perceptions, but also "from within" by affections.

== Modern cognitive science ==
Present developments of modern selectionist theories of memory in cognitive science seems to confirm Bergson's theories. Selectionist models offer new and potentially useful approaches to a theory of remembering. On the model of natural selection, these selectionist theories require at least two processing components: a device which generates a range of memory representations and a selection process which preserves a subset of those representations. Bergson shows how the subjective experience of remembering might be understood within a selectionist framework.

The book is considered to be a major philosophical contribution to the analysis of implicit memory.

== Editions ==
- Matter and Memory, 1990 (Matière et Mémoire, 1896), translators N.M. Paul and W.S. Palmer. Zone Books ISBN 978-0-942299-05-2
- Matter and Memory 2004. [Republication of the 1912 MacMillan edition, translators N. Margaret Paul and W. Scott Palmer. Dover Publications. ISBN 0-486-43415-X.]
