= Emotional selection (information) =

Psychology concept

Emotional selection describes the perpetuation and evolution of information based on its ability to evoke emotions. The hypothesis posits that information spreads throughout populations not just based on their factual accuracy or utility, but also based on the emotional impact it has on recipients.

== Overview ==
Emotional selection suggests that if a meme or a piece of information evokes strong emotions—whether positive or negative—it is more likely to be shared and propagated. The emotional response effectively acts as a selection mechanism, giving certain memes an advantage in the competition for attention and dissemination. This hypothesis underscores the importance of emotional resonance in the virality and longevity of information in cultural evolution.

Additionally researchers have developed coupled models that treat emotion and information as two interacting propagation processes in social media. Instead of tracking "information spread," these models examine how group emotions influence information thresholds and diffusion patterns. They found that group emotional atmosphere influences how quickly and how far information is spread and that positive or neutral emotions often become dominant over negative ones. Additionally, they found that denser networks intensify emotional differences during the spread. Additional study on this topic has revealed emotional responses themselves can also predict how content spreads. High-arousal and positive emotional reactions correlated with stronger moral contagion and real-time emotional measures outperform self-reports in predicting spread.

Researchers of social media are now using epidemic models (the same disease spread kind) to include emotional contagion dynamics. These models divide exposed platform-users into positive, negative, and neutral emotional states and simulate how each emotional state evolves alongside information. This research discovered that the emotional responses of "key opinion leaders" have disproportional effects on information flow and group emotional states.

A study from late 2025 on emotional diffusion found that following "high-impact events" (they used celebrity suicides as the main one) specific emotions influenced different spread metrics such as: size, speed, and burstiness. The emotion of disgust caused things to spread widely and rapidly, anger and surprise showed high initial burst but short "lifetimes" (how long it remained relevant), and joy tended to have a longer "lifetime". This further proves that emotional patterns shape how information propagates.

A 2024 study on the influence of emotional factors of social media users on their information sharing behaviors during crisis found that positive emotions influenced information sharing more strongly than cognition alone and that one's emotional state acts as a "mediator" between their thoughts and whether or not they will share something online. This effects their decision making framework, not just diffusion.

A study conducted on the COVID-19 pandemic showed that misinformation spread is also tied closely to the emotional contagion process, revealing that certain group dynamics and "bad actors" use this to shape the propagation of their misinformation during crises.
