= Emotional selection (dreaming) =

Psychological theory of dreaming

Emotional selection is a psychological hypothesis of dreaming that describes dreams as modifying and testing mental schemas. According to the hypothesis, schemas tentatively accommodate dream themes during non-REM sleep (when neurons are highly plastic) and then test these changes during the high neural activity of REM sleep. During a REM dream test, the mind monitors its emotional response. If the prior schema modifications alleviate anxiety, improve satisfaction, reduce sadness, or in other ways appear to enhance the dreamer's fitness, the non-REM schema modifications are selected. Modifications that exacerbate emotional responses are deemed maladaptive and consequently either culled or further modified and tested.

The schemas modified and tested by emotional selection are those essential for meeting needs. For instance, a dream of being attacked, chased, or falling would test schemas' ability to cope with situations when the need for safety is thwarted; a dream of being rejected by a loved one would test the dreamer's ability to accept situations when their belongingness needs are unmet; a dream of failing an exam, accidental nudity, or technical difficulties would test schemas' ability to cope with an unmet need for esteem; and so forth.

As an example of an application of the emotional selection process, a dreamer's need for independence may be elevated by processing a non-REM dream in which they act independently, such as competently completing a complex task or successfully navigating a challenging social situation. During this non-REM dream, schemas tentatively accommodate the dream's theme, resulting in an elevated sense of independence at the close of the non-REM sleep phase. Despite the goal of enhancing schemas, such accommodations can be unintentionally maladaptive. For instance, children often benefit from perceived dependence, rather than independence, as an overly developed sense of independence can result in a child wandering into dangerous situations. Due to the possibility of such maladaptive accommodations, a second set of dreams is processed during subsequent REM sleep in the form of test scenarios that test the prior non-REM accommodations. A dreamer whose independence was elevated during a non-REM dream may find themselves exercising their newfound elevated independence during a REM dream of exploring a dangerous environment or single-handedly coping with a complex problem. During these REM dream tests, the mind monitors its emotional response. If the prior accommodations improve the dreamer's emotional fitness, they are selected.

Emotional selection explains why dreams can be both pleasant and unpleasant. Unpleasant themes—being chased, falling, rejected, or failing—test schema modifications for coping with thwarted needs. Pleasant themes—flying, finding treasure, making discoveries, or succeeding—test for coping with satisfied needs. This latter concept of coping with satisfied needs may seem paradoxical, but schemas shaped by unworthiness or low self-esteem can inhibit a person from accepting the satisfaction of their needs. Therefore, pleasant REM dreams test the dreamer's perceived worthiness of having their needs met.

Emotional selection's description of REM dreams as tests explains why dreams are often bizarre. Common dream scenarios that incorporate outwardly bizarre elements, such as teeth falling out, accidental nudity in public, monsters, flying, and other surreal objects, characters, and situations, provide the extreme conditions necessary to test whether mental schemas can cope with stress, euphoria, and other such extremes while awake.

The process underlying emotional selection is an example of dual-phase evolution (DPE). This categorization invites parallels between emotional selection and natural selection. Charles Darwin described the evolution of species as a process that includes two phases: a modification phase (variation) and a selection phase (natural selection). Emotional selection also includes two phases: a modification phase (accommodation) and a selection phase (emotional selection). However, unlike the life-or-death tests described by natural selection, emotional selection theory employs dreams to safely evolve mental schemas during sleep.
