= Direct experience =

Concept in epistemology

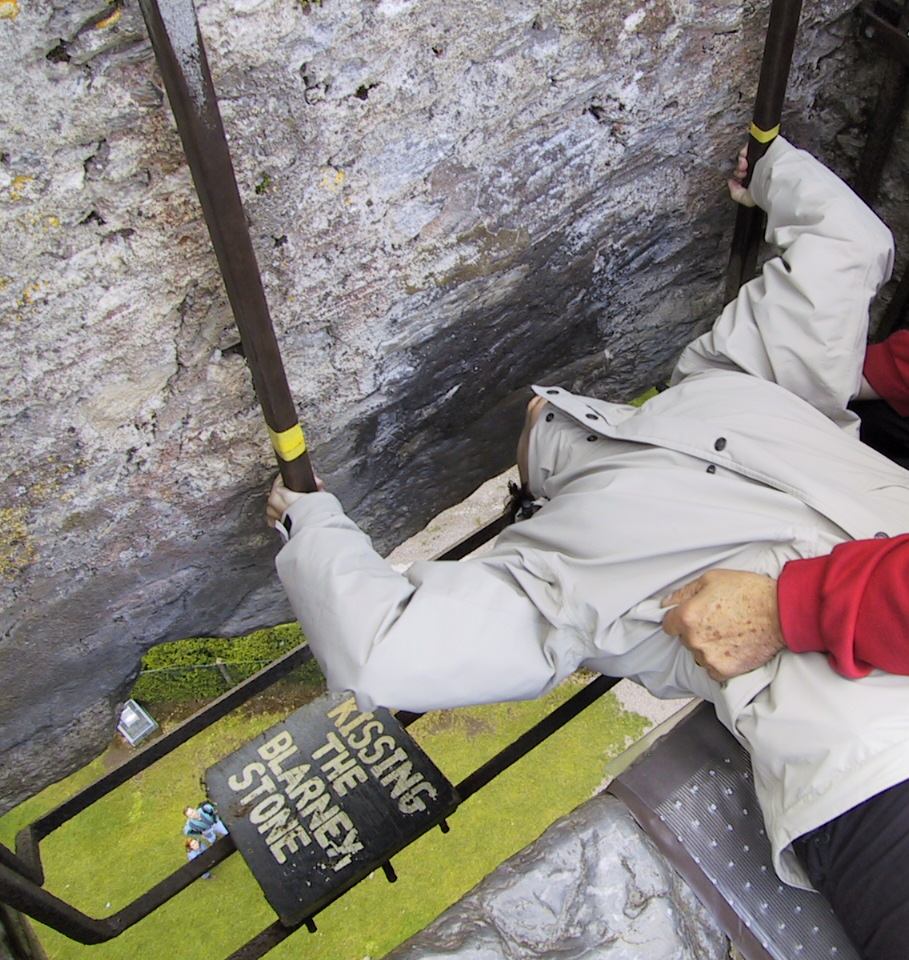
While easily described, the direct experience of kissing the Blarney Stone is less easily obtained

Direct experience or immediate experience generally denotes experience gained through immediate sense perception. Many philosophical systems hold that knowledge or skills gained through direct experience cannot be fully put into words.

== See also ==
- Abhijñā
- Firsthand learning
