= Ghalib Halasa =

Jordanian novelist and writer (1932–1989)

- غالب هلسا
- Born: December 3, 1932; Ma’in, Emirate of Transjordan
- Died: December 17, 1989 (age 57); Damascus, Syria
- Resting place: Ma'in, Jordan
- Education: American University of Beirut
- Occupations: Novelist, short story writer, literary critic, translator, political activist
- Writing career
- Language: Arabic
- Period: 1955–1989
- Genres: Novel, Short story
- Notable works: Laughter; The Question; Sultana

Ghalib Halasa (Arabic: غالب هلسا; December 3, 1932 – December 17, 1989) was a Jordanian novelist, short story writer, literary critic, translator, and political activist. He was a prominent literary figure in the Arabic-speaking world during the 20th century. Some of Halasa's most influential novels include al-Dhahik (Laughter), al-Su’al (The Question), and Sultana.

From a young age, Halasa was interested in socialist politics. His views saw him exiled from Jordan in 1955, at the age of 22. While migrating throughout the Middle East, he faced repeated expulsions and prison sentences. He spent many years in Iraq, Egypt, Syria, and Lebanon. He died in Damascus at the age of 57, after which his body was returned to Jordan, where he had not been for 34 years.

Halasa's writing combines smooth reading with complex structuring. He could draw on diverse narrative techniques and literary traditions. According to comparative literature professor Walid Hamarneh, Halasa wanted to "[utilize] modern and post-modern techniques in novel writing, while at the same time preserving the great insights and creative achievements of the nineteenth-century realists."

== Early life ==
Ghalib Halasa was born in December 1932, in a mostly Christian village called Ma'in, within the Madaba governorate of Jordan. His exact date of birth is unknown. Fairly early in life, Halasa began reading books in Arabic, French, and English, while also demonstrating strong writing skills at the Christian Mutran boarding school for boys. Specifically, Halasa read a great deal about Marxism, politics, and American literature.

Following high school, Halasa attended the American University of Beirut, where he received his B.A. in Journalism. For two years, while at the university, Halasa split his time between studying at the American University of Beirut and teaching at a school in Amman, Jordan. While in college, Halasa also became a member of the Communist Party. This resulted in jail-time, including almost two years in a Baghdad prison.

== Exile ==
Forbidden from living in Jordan due to his political beliefs, Halasa headed to Egypt in 1955. He studied at the American University in Cairo, where he also taught, and began writing articles on various literary topics. Later, Halasa began translating for both the Chinese Embassy and the German Press Agency. Throughout this time, Halasa remained interested and engaged in socialist ideologies and politics. After attending protests against Anwar Sadat, Halasa saw time in prison once more, and eventually banishment from Egypt in 1976.

After exile from Egypt, he spent time in numerous countries: Iraq, Lebanon, Libya, Germany, and lastly Syria, where he died.

In 1982, Halasa fought alongside the Palestinians in the Lebanon War.

== Works ==
Halasa authored two collections of short stories, seven novels, four books of literary criticism, and three other books of various natures. He also translated several books from English. Much of his work remains untranslated.

=== Novels ===
- Laughter (1970) الضحك
- Sandstorms (1975) الخماسين
- Slaves, Bedouins and Peasants (1976) زنوج وبدو وفلاحون
- The Question (1979) السؤال
- Crying on the Ruins (1980)البكاء على الأطلال
- Three Faces of Baghdad (1982) ثلاثة وجوه لبغداد
- The Storytellers (1988) الروائيون
- Sultana (1988) سلطانة

=== Story collections ===
- Wadi and the Holy Milada & Other Stories (1969) وديع والقديسة ميلادة وآخرون

=== Scholarly publications ===
- The World is Matter and Motion: Studies in Islamic Arab Philosophy (1980) العالم مادة وحركة: دراسات في الفلسفة العربية الإسلامية
- Readings of the Works of Yusuf al-Sayigh, Yusuf Idris, Jabra Ibrahim Jabra, and Hanna Minah: the Noble Prostitute and the Problem of Women's Freedom (1981) قراءات في أعمال يوسف الصايغ، يوسف إدريس، جبرا إبراهيم جبرا، حنا مينة (المومس الفاضلة ومشكلة حرية المرأة)
- Space in the Arabic Novel (1981) المكان في الرواية العربية
- Ignorance in Civilization's Struggle (1982) الجهل في معركة الحضارة
- Articles on Criticism (1984) فصول في النقد

=== Translations from English ===
- William Faulkner (1976) وليم فوكنر, from Michael Millgate's William Faulkner (1961), a biography about American writer William Faulkner
- Bernard Shaw (1977) برنارد شو, from A M Gibbs’ Shaw (1969), a biography about Irish playwright George Bernard Shaw
- Bachelard, Jamiliyyat al-Makan (1980) باشلار، جمليات المكان, from Gaston Bachelard’s La Poétique de l'Espace (1958)
- Al-Haris fi Haql al-Shufan (1983) الحارس في حقل الشوفان, from J.D. Salinger’s The Catcher in the Rye (1951)

== See also ==
- Arabic Literature
- William Faulkner
- Novel
- Avant-garde
