= Michael Martone =

American writer (born 1955)

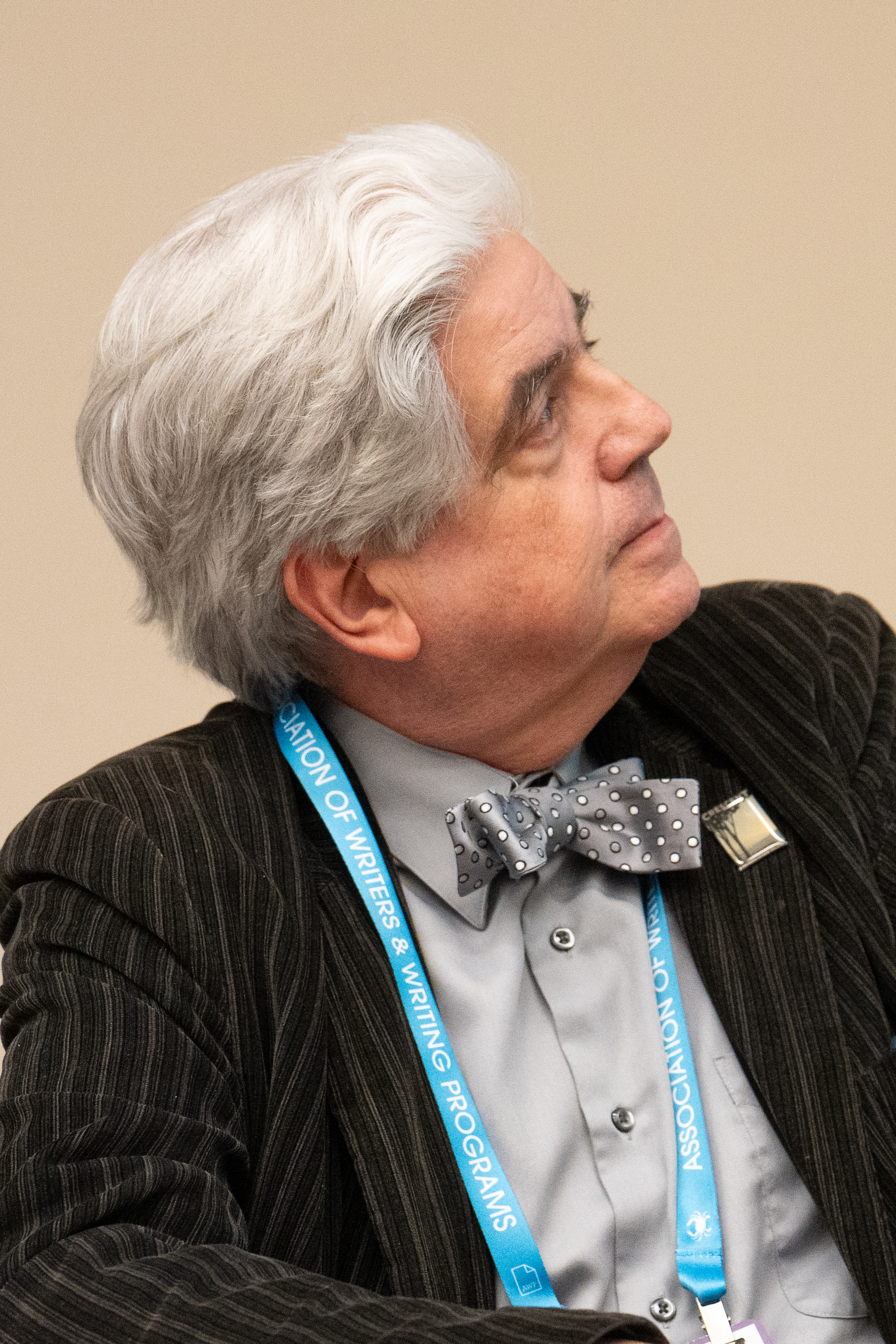
- Martone at AWP 2026
- Born: August 22, 1955 (age 71); Fort Wayne, Indiana, U.S.
- Education: Butler University; Indiana University; Johns Hopkins University (MA)
- Occupation: Writer
- Spouse: Theresa Pappas
- Writing career
- Genres: Short story, non-fiction, formalist
- Website: fourforaquarter.com

Michael Martone (born August 22, 1955, in Fort Wayne, Indiana) is an American author. Since 1977, he has written nearly 30 books and chapbooks. He was a professor at the Program in Creative Writing at the University of Alabama, where he taught from 1996 until his retirement in 2020.

Martone has won two Fellowships from the NEA and a grant from the Ingram Merrill Foundation. His stories and essays have appeared and been cited in the Pushcart Prize, The Best American Stories and The Best American Essays anthologies.

== Biography ==
Martone attended Butler University and graduated from Indiana University. He holds an MA from the Johns Hopkins Writing Seminars, where he studied under John Barth. He has been a faculty member of the MFA Program for Writers at Warren Wilson College, and has taught at Iowa State University, Harvard University, Syracuse University and the University of Alabama.

He lives in Tuscaloosa with his wife, the poet, Theresa Pappas. The couple has two sons, both of whom are writers: Sam Martone and Nicholas V. Pappas.

Aside from studying under and befriending John Barth, Martone also developed a close relationship with the writer Thomas Pynchon while the two lived together in Brooklyn. It was later on, while teaching at Syracuse in the early 1990s, that Martone befriended a young David Foster Wallace and introduced to him a number of influential works, most notably Lewis Hyde's The Gift.

== Career ==
Martone's 2005 work, Michael Martone, is an investigation of form and autobiography. It was originally written as a series of contributor's notes for various publications. One of his central interests is the "false biography" and the often blurry boundary between fact and fiction. He also considers himself a "neo-regionalist."

The permeable boundary between fact and fiction is reflected in books like his 2001 The Blue Guide to Indiana which, as a disclaimer on the cover makes clear, "is in no way affiliated with, endorsed by, or associated with the series of travel books titled Blue Guide," and "in no way factually depicts or accurately represents the State of Indiana." The disclaimer, Martone explains, was included after he received a cease and desist letter from the publisher of "the real Blue Guide." This letter in turn inspired the opening chapter of Martone's 2015 anthology, Winesburg, Indiana, written in the form of a cease and desist letter from the fictional town of Winesburg—created by the novelist Sherwood Anderson—which claims proprietary rights to “the distribution of Sadness, Fear, Longing, and Confusion itself. We have patented madness. We own Trembling. We extensively market Grief.“ Martone further obscured the line between fact and fiction in his 2020 book, The Complete Writings of Art Smith, the Bird Boy of Fort Wayne, which was called "an ingenious reimagining of the real-life inventor of skywriting" by the New York Times.

Martone has devoted much of his career to disrupting and defamiliarizing the taken-as-given notions of order, ownership, and identity in his field, and has been described as literature's "most notorious mutineer." In 1988 his membership to the American Academy of Poets was briefly revoked after he published two books, one listed as "prose" and one as "poetry" which were—aside from the line-breaks in one—completely identical to one another. His AWP membership has been revoked multiple times. In the late nineties, after reading Neal Bowers' book of non-fiction, Words for the Taking, which describes the author's agonizing hunt for the person who has plagiarized his poems, Martone began to publish poetry under the pseudonym "Neal Bowers." "I am not using Bowers' poems," Martone later explained, "only the name. So when these poems get published, Neal Bowers could actually include them on his vita as far as I'm concerned. I hope he does ... I understand the theft of intellectual property that got Neal Bowers so worked up. But is it plagiarism to actually contribute to someone else's work? I am not stealing his work but actually donating my own to his store of work."

According to Martone he has written under a number of nom de plumes: "I've published fictional poems under the name Neal Bowers, fictional stories under the names Christian Piers, Jonah Ogles, Arin Fisher, Sarah Mignin, and Matthew Douglas McCabe, fictional nonfiction under the username zzxyzz [on Wikipedia.org], fictional advertisements under the name Klemm Co., and fictional songs with the band under the name AVALANCHE." Of this impulse, Martone has said "I’ve never really felt much like 'Michael Martone'—sometimes I think my entire life I’ve been wearing a costume. At some point I put it on to cope with things that Michael Martone was too weak to take on as himself. And after a while I forgot I was even wearing the costume. Now I can’t take it off. I’ve forgotten where the zipper is, and I’m stuck in it."

== Works ==
- At a Loss, 1977 (prose poems)
- Alive and Dead in Indiana, 1984 (fiction)
- Return to Powers, 1985 (nonfiction)
- Safety Patrol, 1988 (fiction)
- A Place of Sense: Pieces of the Midwest, 1988 (editor)
- Fort Wayne Is Seventh on Hitler’s List, 1990 (fiction)
- Townships: Pieces of the Midwest, 1992 (editor)
- Fort Wayne Is Seventh on Hitler’s List [Revised and Expanded], 1992 (fiction)
- Pensées: The Thoughts of Dan Quayle, 1994 (fiction)
- Seeing Eye, 1995 (fiction)
- The Flatness and Other Landscapes, 1999 (nonfiction)
- The Scribner Anthology of Contemporary Short Fiction: Fifty North American American Stories Since 1970, 1999 (editor, with Lex Williford)
- Martone, Michael (August 2001). The Blue Guide to Indiana. ISBN 1-57366-095-7. OCLC 46401580.
- 101 Damnations: The Humorists' Tour of Personal Hells. New York: Thomas Dunne Books. 2002. ISBN 0-312-28480-2. OCLC 48655651. (contributor)
- Extreme Fiction: Fabulists and Formalists, 2003 (editor, with Robin Hemley)
- Michael Martone. Normal. Illinois: Fiction Collective 2. 2005. ISBN 1-57366-126-0. OCLC 61131775.
- Unconventions: Attempting the Art of Craft and the Craft of Art, 2005 (nonfiction)
- Rules of Thumb: 73 Authors Reveal Their Fiction Writing Fixations, 2006 (editor)
- Double-Wide: Collected Fiction of Michael Martone, 2007 (fiction)
- Touchstone Anthology of Contemporary Creative Nonfiction, 2007 (editor, with Lex Williford)
- Racing in Place: Collages, Fragments, Postcards, Ruins, 2008 (nonfiction)
- Not Normal, Illinois: Peculiar Fictions from the Flyover, 2009 (editor)
- Four for a Quarter: Fictions. Tuscaloosa: University of Alabama Press. 2011. ISBN 978-1-57366-827-9. OCLC 772845458.
- Memoranda. Bull City Press. 2015. ISBN 978-1-4951-5762-2. OCLC 951955497.
- Martone, Michael; Furuness, Bryan (2015). Winesburg, Indiana: A Fork River Anthology. ISBN 978-0-253-01734-5. OCLC 913869303.
- Martone, Michael (2018). Brooding: Arias, Choruses, Lullabies, Follies, Dirges, and a Duet. ISBN 978-0-8203-5307-4. OCLC 1005849629.
- The Moon over Wapakoneta: Fictions & Science Fictions from Indiana & Beyond. ISBN 978-1-57366-068-6. OCLC 1028610732.
- The Complete Writings of Art Smith, the Bird Boy of Fort Wayne, 2020 ("editor") ISBN 978-1-950774-21-0
- Plain Air: Sketches from Winesburg, Indiana. Reno, Nevada: Baobab Press. 2022. ISBN 978-1-936097-42-5. OCLC 1292732196. Official wiki for Winesburg, Indiana.
- The Tiny Book of Forts: Flash Fiction. Buttonhook Press. 2023.
- Table Talk & Second Thoughts: A Memoir, book released in conjunction with Booth magazine #19 (2024).
  - Reissued as Table Talk & Second Thoughts: A Memoir in Flashes. Cornerstone Press. 2025. ISBN 978-1-960329-77-6.

== Awards ==
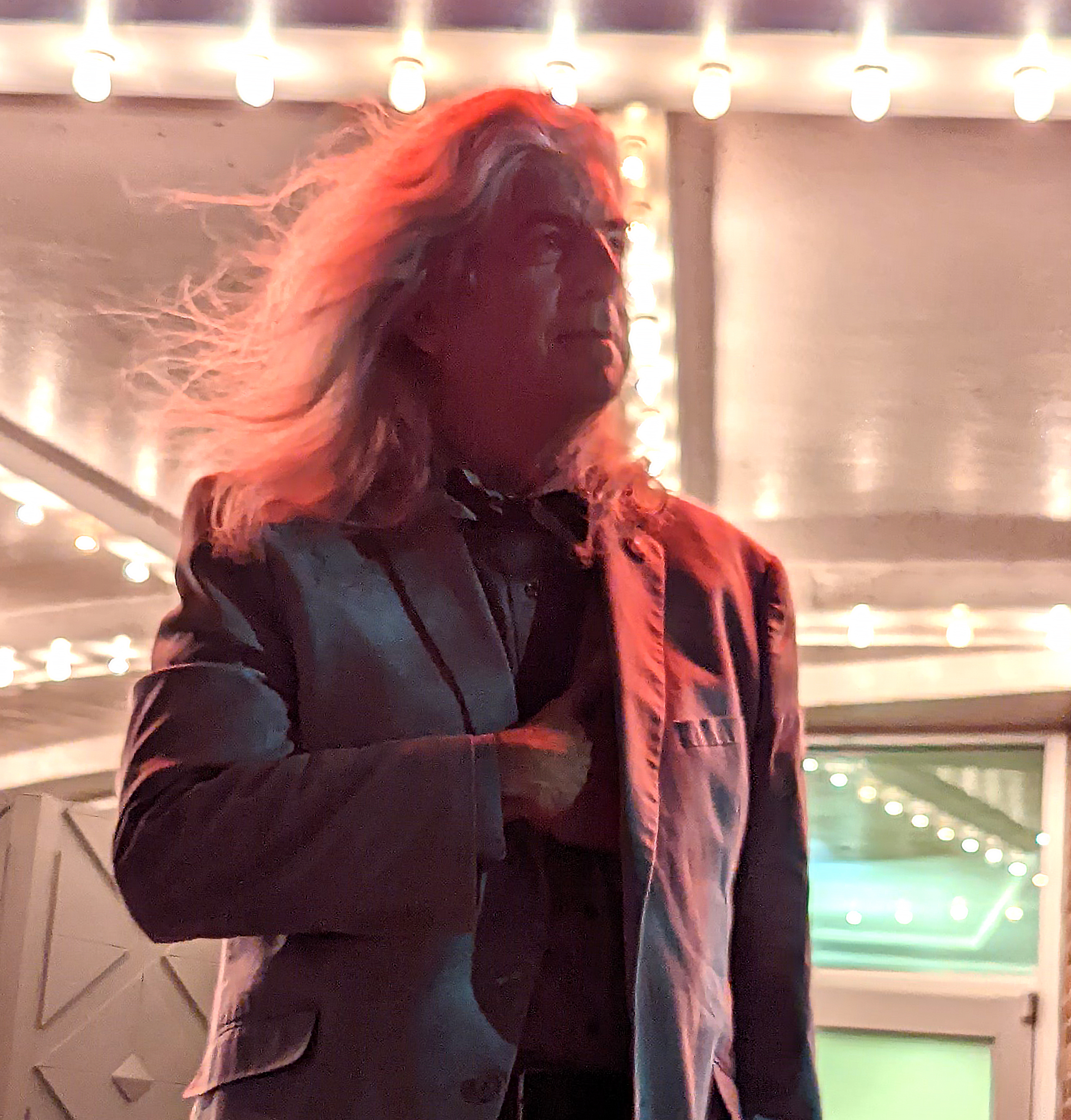
Martone outside the Bama Theatre, Tuscaloosa, Alabama, after the Druid Arts Award Ceremony, April 7, 2022.

- The Associated Writing Programs Award for Creative Nonfiction, for Flatness and Other Landscapes, University of Georgia Press (1998)
- The Indiana Author's Award (2013)
- The Mark Twain Award by The Society for the Study of Midwestern Literature (2016)
- The 2022 Druid Arts Award for literary educator, The Arts and Humanities Council of Tuscaloosa County, Alabama.
- The Truman Capote Prize For Distinguished Work in the Short Story or Literary Non-Fiction (2023), the Monroeville Literary Festival.
