= The Invisible Hotel =

2024 horror novel

The Invisible Hotel is a 2024 horror novel by Korean Canadian author Yeji Y. Ham.

== Plot and setting ==
=== Setting ===
The novel is set in the fictional Korean village of Dalbit. Families in Dalbit traditionally keep the bones of their ancestors in their bathtubs, washing them regularly, and women from the village give birth in those bathtubs.

=== Plot ===
The novel centres around a young woman from Dalbit named Yewon. Yewon has just lost her job at a convinience store when a range of difficulties hit her family, including the death of her father in a workplace accident, her mother's declining health, the estrangment of her sister from the family, and her brother being stationed on the border with North Korea during his military service. Against these difficulties, Yewon begins to be haunted by dreams of a dilapated, labyrinthian hotel.

== Themes and analysis ==
Gianni Washington of the Chicago Review of Books wrote that the novel was "about the fears that are dutifully passed from one generation to the next," noting how "the conflict between North and South Korea, simmering still beneath a fragile truce, looms as the perpetual backdrop for this contemporary tale."

Olivia Ho of The Straits Times compared the novel to French philosopher Gaston Bachelard's book The Poetics of Space for how it "explores how perceptions of inhabited space shape memory and imagination through thought and dreams," saying that "where Bachelard sees the house as a timeless sanctuary from history, Ham constructs instead houses that cannot be homes, only spaces that literalise past trauma. In these spaces, those who survived the Korean War of the 1950s pass their trauma down to generations who did not experience it first-hand, but who are nevertheless also forced to inhabit it." In an interview with Gerardo Sámano Córdova of BOMB, Ham cited the 2007 film My Winnipeg by Guy Maddin as having influenced the novel, also saying that "architecture is intimately tied to loss, seeking to fill emptiness through structure... Spaces once bustling with community life undergo a drastic transformation in abandonment, as if rejecting their original purpose. The futile attempts of the old man to enter the house reflect the architecture’s resistance to sharing. On the other hand, the abandoned hotel, meant for hospitality, forces Yewon to share in the fear of war against her will. For me, architecture acts as a vessel where sharing is both encouraged and constrained, subject to unforeseen evolutions."

== Reception ==
Daniel Gawthrop of The British Columbia Review praised Ham's writing for being "tactile and sensual, poetically so in places, filled with tastes and smells," as well as her "mastery of the surreal," saying that the novel "should easily find a place on North American literary prize longlists." Ian Mond of Locus Magazine also praised the novel for "overflowing with startling visual imagery," while noting that it was "an uncomfortable novel; some might find it too triggering to read." Kirkus Reviews described the novel as "ethereal" and "intriguing."
