= Boutroux =

Boutroux is a surname. Notable people with the surname include:

- Émile Boutroux (1845–1921), French philosopher of science and religion
- Pierre Boutroux (1880–1922), French mathematician and historian of science, son of Émile
