= The Poetics of Space =

1958 book by Gaston Bachelard

- Cover of the first edition
- Author: Gaston Bachelard
- Original title: La Poétique de l'Espace
- Translator: Maria Jolas
- Language: French
- Series: Bibliothèque de philosophie contemporaine
- Subject: Architecture
- Publisher: Presses Universitaires de France
- Publication date: 1958
- Publication place: France
- English publication date: 1964
- Media type: Print (Hardback & Paperback)
- Pages: 241 (English translation)
- ISBN: 0-8070-6439-4 (English edition)

The Poetics of Space (French: La Poétique de l'Espace) is a 1958 book about architecture by the French philosopher Gaston Bachelard. The book is considered an important work about art. Commentators have compared Bachelard's views to those of the philosopher Martin Heidegger.

== Summary ==
Bachelard applies the method of phenomenology to architecture, basing his analysis not on purported origins (as was the trend in Enlightenment thinking about architecture) but on lived experience in architectural places and their contexts in nature. He focuses especially on the personal, emotional response to buildings both in life and in literary works, both in prose and in poetry. He is thus led to consider spatial types such as the attic, the cellar, drawers and the like. Bachelard implicitly urges architects to base their work on the experiences it will engender rather than on abstract rationales that may or may not affect viewers and users of architecture.

Sometimes the house of the future is better built, lighter and larger than all the houses of the past, so that the image of the dream house is opposed to that of the childhood home…. Maybe it is a good thing for us to keep a few dreams of a house that we shall live in later, always later, so much later, in fact, that we shall not have time to achieve it. For a house that was final, one that stood in symmetrical relation to the house we were born in, would lead to thoughts—serious, sad thoughts—and not to dreams. It is better to live in a state of impermanence than in one of finality.

— Gaston Bachelard, The Poetics of Space

Bachelard also discusses psychoanalysis and the work of the psychiatrist Carl Jung. Comparing the psychoanalytic and phenomenological approaches to his subject matter, he sees merit in both, but finds the phenomenological approach preferable.

== Publication history ==
The Poetics of Space was first published by Presses Universitaires de France in 1958. In 1964, the Orion Press published the book, with a foreword by the philosopher Étienne Gilson, in an English translation by the writer Maria Jolas. Beacon Press republished the work in English in 1969. In 1994, it republished it in a new edition with an added foreword by the historian John R. Stilgoe. In 2014, Penguin Books published an edition with a foreword by the novelist Mark Z. Danielewski and an introduction by the philosopher Richard Kearney.

== Reception and influence ==
=== Philosophy ===
The Poetics of Space has influenced the philosophers Paul Ricœur and Edward S. Casey. Ricœur was influenced by Bachelard's understanding of the imagination. Casey identified The Poetics of Space as an influence on his work Getting Back into Place (1993). He wrote that Bachelard shared Heidegger's "emphasis on the importance of dwelling places." However, he added that neither Heidegger nor Bachelard "adequately assessed the role of the human body in the experience of significant places." The philosopher Gary Gutting credited Bachelard with subtly explaining the meaning of archetypal images. Étienne Gilson credited Bachelard with making "one of the major modern contributions to the philosophy of art", and Richard Kearney described the book as "the most concise and consummate expression of Bachelard's philosophy of imagination."

=== Architecture ===
Joan Ockman gave The Poetics of Space a positive review in Harvard Design Magazine. She compared Bachelard's views to Heidegger's, and wrote that, alongside works such as Heidegger's Being and Time (1927) and his essay "Building Dwelling Thinking", The Poetics of Space was a key text for the architect Christian Norberg-Schulz. She also compared Bachelard's views on epistemology to those of the philosopher Thomas Kuhn and described him as an influence on the philosopher Michel Foucault, finding it apparent in Foucault's The Archaeology of Knowledge (1969). John R. Stilgoe praised the book's discussion of "the meaning of domestic space".

=== Literature ===
Camille Paglia identified The Poetics of Space as an influence on her work of literary criticism Sexual Personae (1990). She has commented of Bachelard's "dignified yet fluid phenomenological descriptive method" that it "seemed to me ideal for art", and described Bachelard as "the last modern French writer I took seriously." Mark Z. Danielewski compared The Poetics of Space to the critic Harold Bloom's The Anxiety of Influence (1973), the essayist Lewis Hyde's The Gift: Imagination and the Erotic Life of Property (1983), Steve Erickson's novel Days Between Stations (1985), and Thomas Pynchon's novel Against the Day (2003).

=== Photography and the visual arts ===
The Poetics of Space has also been influential in photography and the visual arts. The anthology Poetics of Space: A Critical Photographic Anthology (1995) took its title from the book, and later writers on photography have drawn on its ideas as well as questioned them, as in Vanessa Longden’s critical study of the photographer Francesca Woodman. Two museum exhibitions, the Dallas Museum of Art's For a Dreamer of Houses (2020) and the Pennsylvania Academy of the Fine Arts's Intimate Immensity (2019), took their titles and premises from its chapters.

== See also ==
- The Poetics of Reverie
- Aesthetics
- Phenomenology (architecture)
- Khôra
