= Stilgoe =

Stilgoe may mean:

- Joe Stilgoe (born 29 May 1979), a British singer, pianist and songwriter
- John R. Stilgoe, an award-winning historian and photographer who is a professor in the History of Landscape at Harvard University
- Richard Stilgoe (born 28 March 1943), is a British songwriter, lyricist and musician, and BBC television personality
