= Lecourt =

Lecourt is a French surname. Notable people with the surname include:

- Dominique Lecourt (1944–2022), French philosopher
- Robert Lecourt (1908–2004), French lawyer, politician and judge, President of the European Court of Justice 1967–76
