= Suzanne Bachelard =

French philosopher (1919–2007)

Suzanne Bachelard (October 18, 1919, Voigny – November 3, 2007, Paris) was a French philosopher and academic. In 1958, she published La Conscience de la rationalité. She was the daughter of philosopher Gaston Bachelard whose posthumous book Fragments d'une Poétique du Feu she edited. She taught at the Sorbonne, where she also had Jacques Derrida as her assistant. She was the first translator to French of Edmund Husserl's Formal and Transcendental Logic.

== Biography ==
Suzanne Bachelard was the daughter of philosopher Gaston Bachelard and Jeanne Rossi, a school principal who died prematurely on June 20, 1920, at the age of 34, when Suzanne was two years old. Her father took sole responsibility for her education, and until his death, the two remained very close.

She taught philosophy at the Charles de Gaulle University – Lille III, at the École normale supérieure de jeunes filles, and most recently at Paris 1 Panthéon-Sorbonne University and the Institute for the History of Science and Technology.

She edited the text of her father's posthumous book Fragments d'une Poétique du Feu (Fragments of a Poetics of Fire), published by Presses Universitaires de France in 1988.

She died at the age of 88 on November 3, 2007, in Paris and was buried alongside her father and mother in Bar-sur-Aube.

== See also ==
- Charles de Gaulle University – Lille III
- Epistemological psychology

== Bibliography ==
- Geoffrey Bennington (1991) Jacques Derrida, University of Chicago Press. Section Curriculum vitae pp. 325–36, Excerpts
