= Gaston Bachelard =

French philosopher (1884–1962)

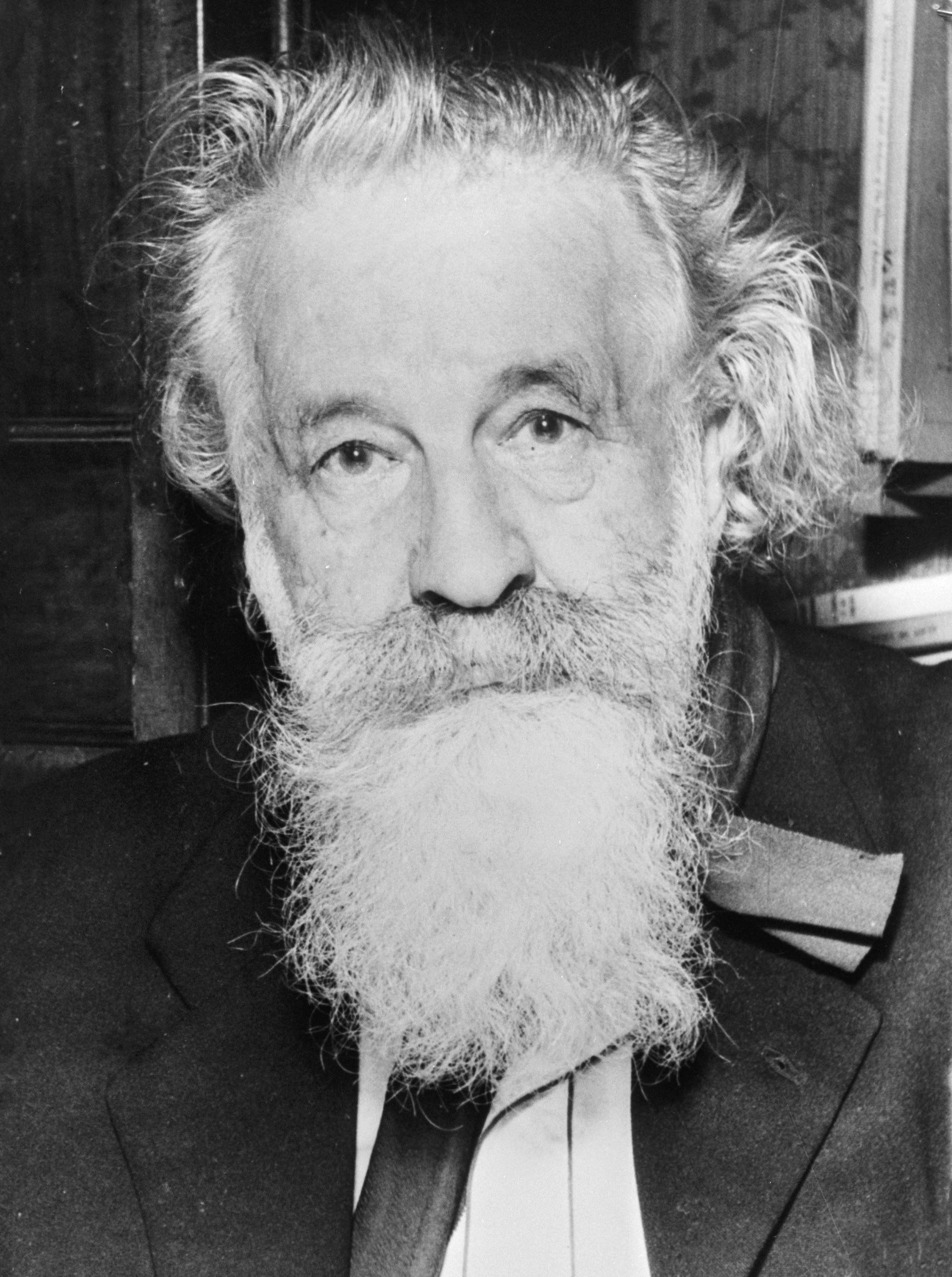
- Born: Gaston Louis Pierre Bachelard; 27 June 1884; Bar-sur-Aube, France
- Died: 16 October 1962 (aged 78); Paris, France

Education
- Education: University of Paris (B.A., 1920; Dr. ès L., 1927)
- Doctoral advisor: Abel Rey; Léon Brunschvicg

Philosophical work
- Era: 20th-century philosophy
- Region: Western philosophy
- School: Continental philosophy French historical epistemology
- Institutions: University of Dijon; University of Paris
- Doctoral students: Gilles-Gaston Granger
- Notable students: Louis Althusser; Jean Laplanche; Jules Vuillemin
- Main interests: Historical epistemology, constructivist epistemology, history and philosophy of science, psychology of science, philosophy of art, phenomenology, psychoanalysis, literary theory, education
- Notable ideas: Epistemological break, the poetics of space, rational materialism, technoscience (techno-science), Ophelia complex

Signature
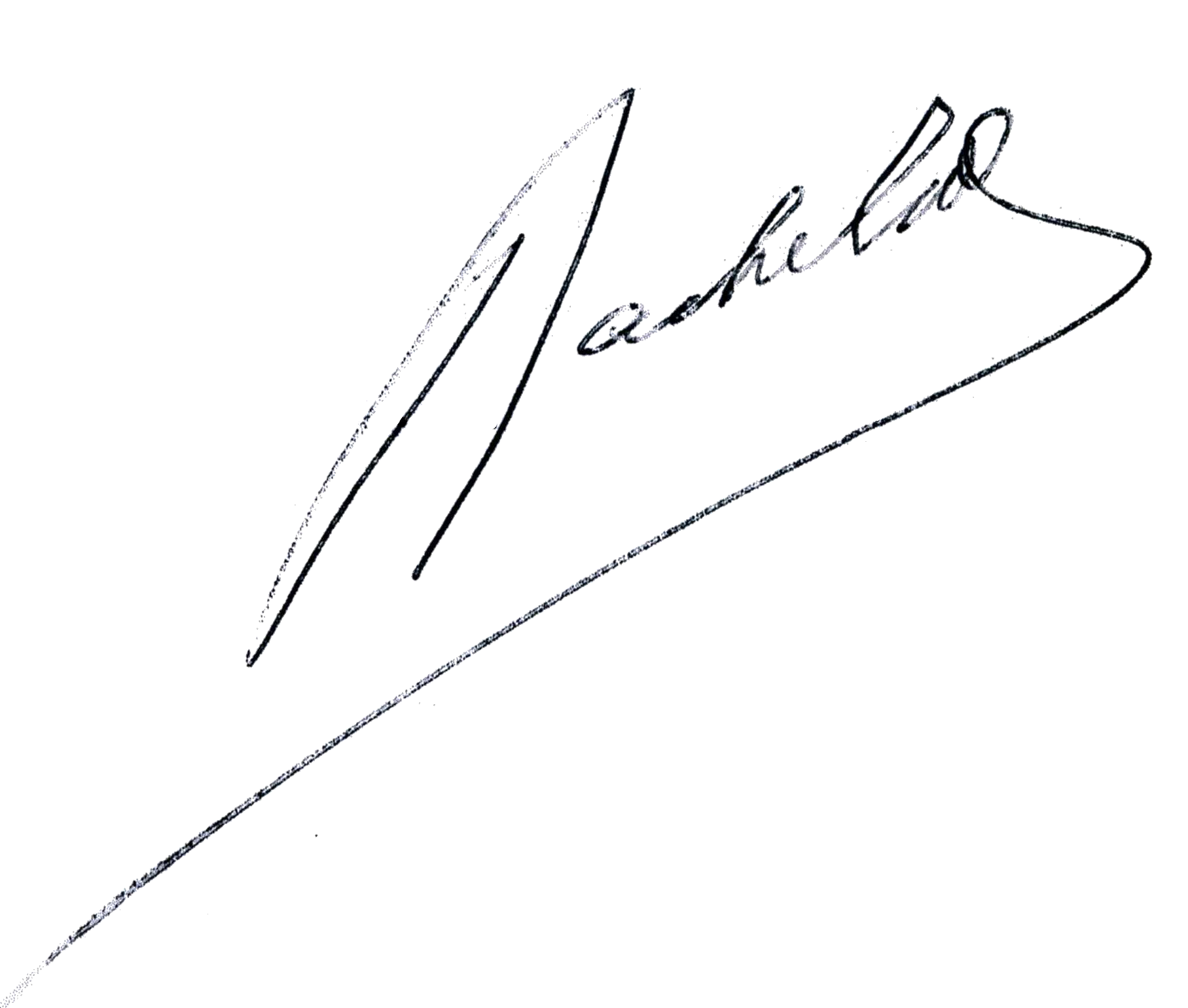

Gaston Louis Pierre Bachelard (/bæʃəˈlɑːr/; French: [baʃlaʁ]; 27 June 1884 – 16 October 1962) was a French philosopher. He made contributions in the fields of poetics and the philosophy of science. To the latter, he introduced the concepts of epistemological obstacle and epistemological break (obstacle épistémologique and rupture épistémologique). He influenced many subsequent French philosophers, among them Michel Foucault, Louis Althusser, Dominique Lecourt and Jacques Derrida, as well as the sociologists Pierre Bourdieu and Bruno Latour.

For Bachelard, the scientific object should be constructed and therefore different from the positivist sciences; in other words, information is in continuous construction. Empiricism and rationalism are not regarded as dualism or opposition but complementary, therefore studies of a priori and a posteriori, or in other words reason and dialectic, are part of scientific research.

== Early life and education ==
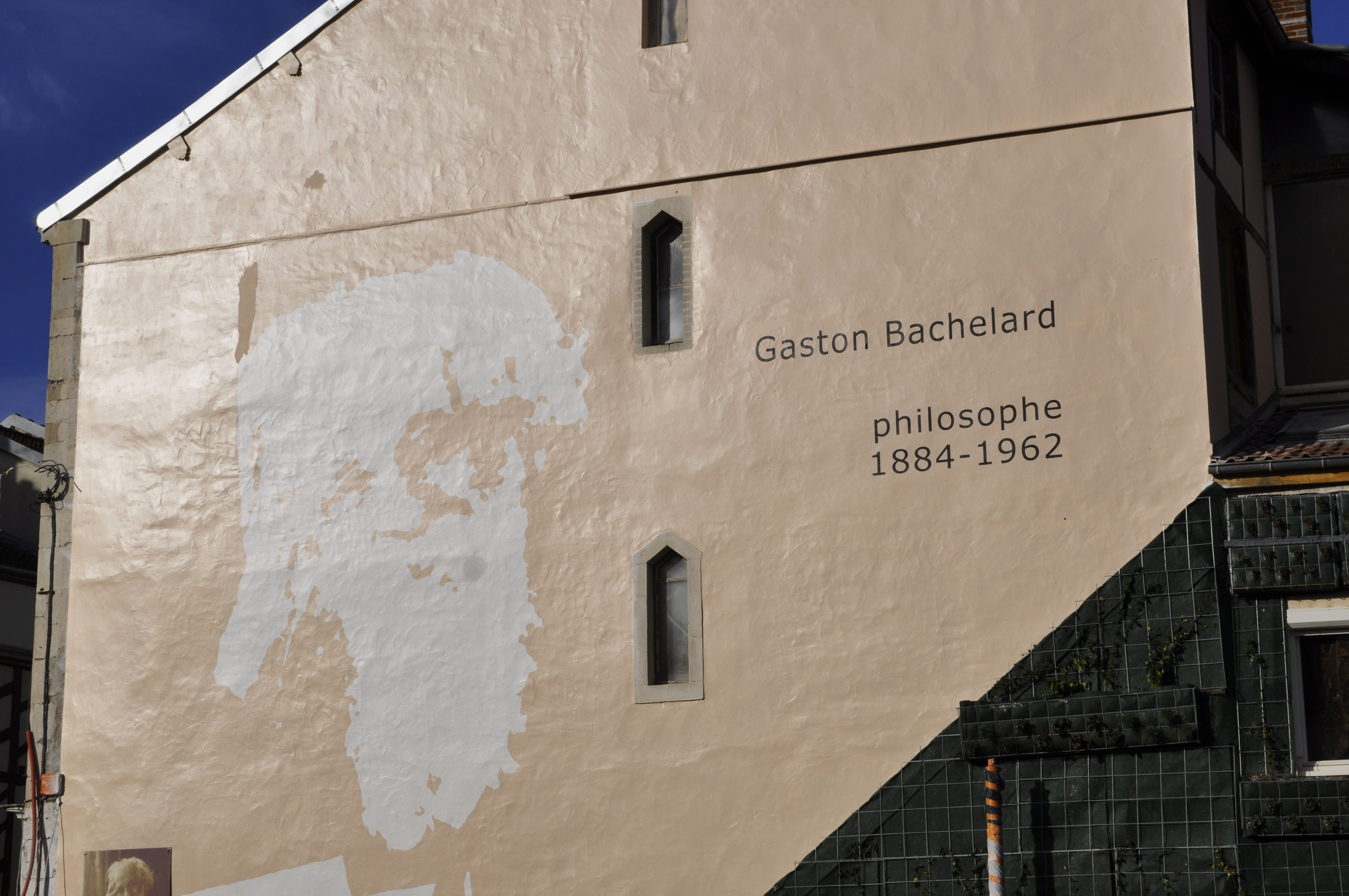
Facade painted in homage to Gaston Bachelard, in Bar-sur-Aube, his birthplace

Bachelard was born in Bar-sur-Aube, France in 1884.

He was a postal clerk in Bar-sur-Aube, and then studied physics and chemistry before finally becoming interested in philosophy. To obtain his doctorate (doctorat ès lettres) in 1927, he wrote two theses: the main one, Essai sur la connaissance approchée, under the direction of Abel Rey, and the complementary one, Étude sur l'évolution d'un problème de physique: la propagation thermique dans les solides, supervised by Léon Brunschvicg.

== Career ==
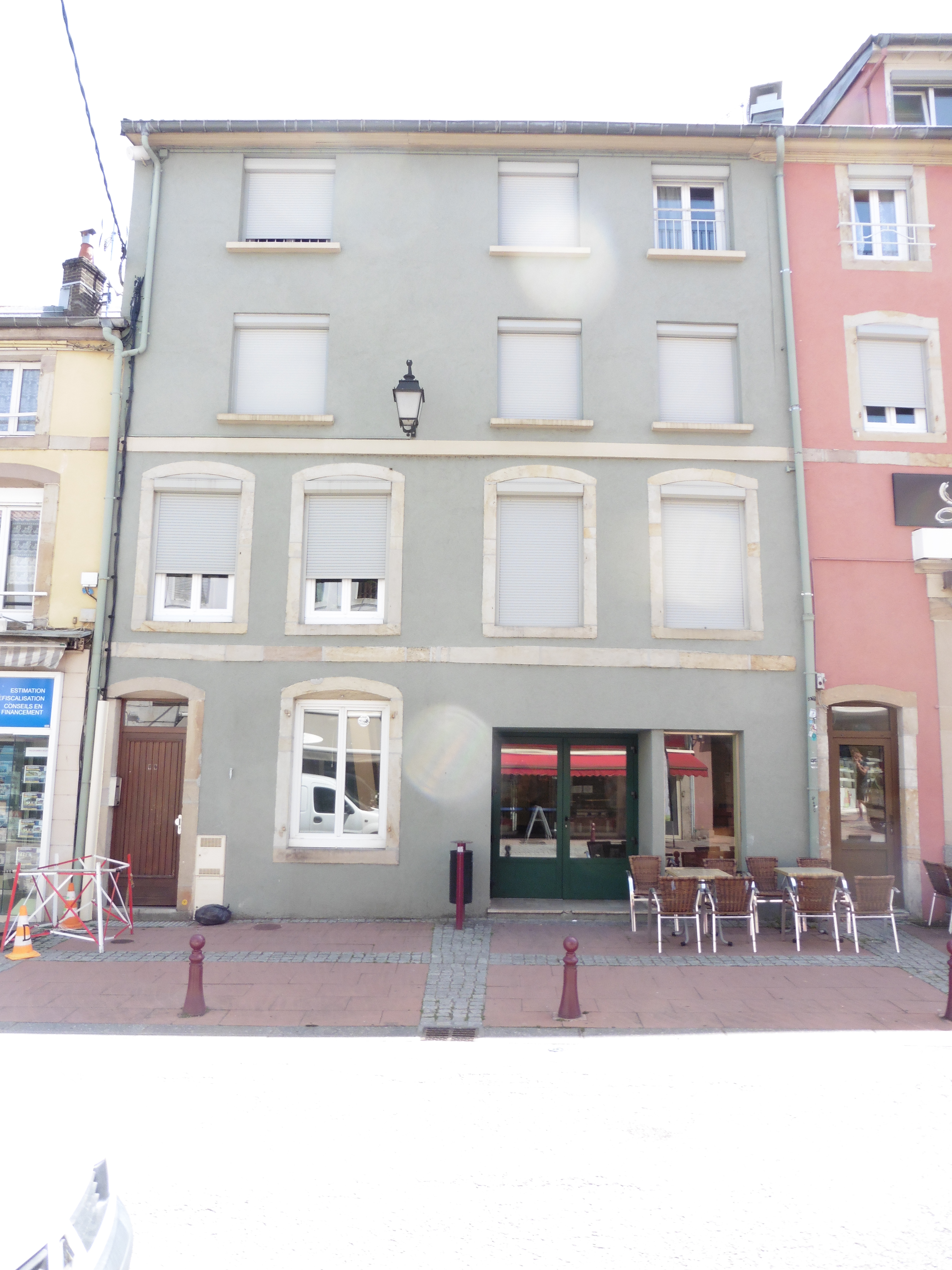
The building in rue de la Xavée in Remiremont, where Bachelard lived from 1903 to 1905

He first taught from 1902 to 1903 at the college of Sézanne, but turned away from teaching to consider a career in telegraphy. Literary by training, he took the technological path before moving towards science and mathematics. In particular, he was fascinated by the great discoveries of the end of the 19th century and the beginning of the 20th century (radioactivity, quantum and wave mechanics, relativity, electromagnetism and wireless telegraphy).

Discharged in March 1919 and unemployed, Bachelard searched and obtained a job in October as a professor of physics and chemistry at the college of Bar-sur-Aube.

At the age of thirty-six he began a completely unexpected philosophical career. Starting decisively in 1922, he acquired the title of Doctor of Letters at the Sorbonne in 1927. His theses, supported by Abel Rey and Léon Brunschvicg, were published. He became a lecturer at the Faculty of Letters of Dijon from October 1927, but remained at the college of Bar-sur-Aube until 1930. He even participated in the municipal elections of 1929 to defend the project of a college for all. He nevertheless accepted a professorship at the University of Burgundy when his daughter Suzanne entered the second degree.

From 1930 to 1940 he was a professor at the University of Dijon and then was appointed chair in the history and philosophy of science at the University of Paris. On 25 August 1937 he was made a Knight of the Legion of Honor. He became a professor at the Sorbonne from 1940 to 1954. He held the chair of the history and philosophy of science, where he succeeded Abel Rey, director of the Institute of History and Philosophy of Science and Technology (IHST), which in 1992 became IHPST. When he was appointed to the Sorbonne as a university professor and director of the Institute for the History of Science and Technology in 1940, he accompanied his daughter in her higher educations.

In 1958, he became a member of the Royal Academy of Science, Letters and Fine Arts of Belgium.

== Personal life and death ==
Bachelard married Jeanne Rossi, a schoolteacher, in 1914. She was transferred to Voigny. His daughter Suzanne was born on 18 October. He travelled the six kilometers to Bar-sur-Aube on foot every day, was provided a very useful education, and enrolled for a philosophy degree. Jeanne died in June 1920, and Bachelard raised his daughter alone. Despite the sex role expectations at the time, Bachelard showed great concern in supporting his daughter's development into an academic career. Counter to stereotypes, he wanted to make his daughter, Suzanne, a scholar. Suzanne became a mathematician and philosopher involved in phenomenological and epistemological research of high standing.

In 1962, he died in Paris.

== Work ==
=== Psychology of science ===
Bachelard's studies of the history and philosophy of science in such works as Le nouvel esprit scientifique ("The New Scientific Spirit", 1934) and La formation de l'esprit scientifique ("The Formation of the Scientific Mind", 1938) were based on his vision of historical epistemology as a kind of psychoanalysis of the scientific mind.

In the English-speaking world, the connection Bachelard made between psychology and the history of science has been little understood. Bachelard demonstrated how the progress of science could be blocked by certain types of mental patterns, creating the concept of obstacle épistémologique ("epistemological obstacle"). One task of epistemology is to make clear the mental patterns at use in science, in order to help scientists overcome the obstacles to knowledge. Another goal is to “give back to human reason its function of agitation and aggressiveness” as Bachelard put it in ‘L'engagement rationaliste’ (1972).

=== Epistemological breaks: the discontinuity of scientific progress ===
Bachelard was critical of Auguste Comte's positivism, which considered science as a continual progress. To Bachelard, scientific developments such as Einstein's theory of relativity demonstrated the discontinuous nature of the history of sciences. Thus, models that framed scientific development as continuous, such as that of Comte and Émile Meyerson, seemed simplistic and erroneous to Bachelard.

Through his concept of "epistemological break", Bachelard underlined the discontinuity at work in the history of sciences. However, the term "epistemological break" itself is almost never used by Bachelard but became famous through Louis Althusser.

He showed that new theories integrated old theories in new paradigms, changing the sense of concepts (for instance, the concept of mass, used by Newton and Einstein in two different senses). Thus, non-Euclidean geometry did not contradict Euclidean geometry, but integrated it into a larger framework.

=== Shifts in scientific perspective ===
Bachelard never saw how seemingly irrational theories often simply represented a drastic shift in scientific perspective. For instance, he never claimed that the theory of probabilities was just another way of complexifying reality through a deepening of rationality (even though critics like Lord Kelvin found this theory irrational).

One of his main theses in The New Scientific Mind was that modern sciences had replaced the classical ontology of the substance with an "ontology of relations", which could be assimilated to something like a process philosophy. For instance, the physical concepts of matter and rays correspond, according to him, to the metaphysical concepts of the thing and of movement; but whereas classical philosophy considered both as distinct, and the thing as ontologically real, modern science can not distinguish matter from rays. It is thus impossible to examine an immobile thing, which was precisely the condition for knowledge according to the classical theory of knowledge (Becoming being impossible to be known, in accordance with Aristotle and Plato's theories of knowledge).

In non-Cartesian epistemology, there is no "simple substance" as in Cartesianism, but only complex objects built by theories and experiments and continuously improved (VI, 4). Intuition is therefore not primitive, but built (VI, 2). These themes led Bachelard to support a sort of constructivist epistemology.

Bachelard was a rationalist in the Cartesian sense, although he recommended his "non-Cartesian epistemology" as a replacement for the more standard Cartesian epistemology. He compared "scientific knowledge" to ordinary knowledge in the way we deal with it, and saw error as only illusion: "Scientifically, one thinks truth as the historical rectification of a persistent error, and experiments as correctives for an initial, common illusion (illusion première)."

The role of epistemology is to show the history of the (scientific) production of concepts. Those concepts are not just theoretical propositions: they are simultaneously abstract and concrete, pervading technical and pedagogical activity. This explains why "The electric bulb is an object of scientific thought… an example of an abstract-concrete object." To understand the way it works, one has to take the detour of scientific knowledge. Epistemology is thus not a general philosophy that aims at justifying scientific reasoning. Instead, it produces regional histories of science.

In addition to epistemology, Bachelard's work deals with many other topics, including poetry, dreams, psychoanalysis, and the imagination. The Psychoanalysis of Fire (1938) and The Poetics of Space (1958) are among the most popular of his works: Jean-Paul Sartre cites the former and Bachelard's Water and Dreams in his Being and Nothingness (1943), and the latter had a wide reception in architectural theory circles, and continues to be influential in literary theory and creative writing. In philosophy, this nocturnal side of his work is developed by his student Gilbert Durand.

== Legacy ==
Bachelard influenced many subsequent French philosophers, among them Michel Foucault, Louis Althusser, Dominique Lecourt, Georges Canguilhem, Gilbert Simondon, and Roland Barthes, as well as the sociologists Pierre Bourdieu and Bruno Latour.

== Bibliography ==
His works include:

- Essai sur la connaissance approchée (1928)
- Étude sur l'évolution d'un problème de physique: la propagation thermique dans les solides (1928)
- La valeur inductive de la relativité (1929)
- La pluralisme cohérent de la chimie moderne (1932)
- L'Intuition de l'instant (1932)
- Les intuitions atomistiques: essai de classification (1933)
- Le nouvel esprit scientifique (1934)
- La dialectique de la durée (1936)
- L'expérience de l'espace dans la physique contemporaine (1937)
- La formation de l'esprit scientifique: contribution à une psychanalyse de la connaissance objective (1938)
- La psychanalyse du feu (1938) (The Psychoanalysis of Fire, 1964)
- La philosophie du non: essai d'une philosophie du nouvel esprit scientifique (1940), publisher Pellicanolibri, 1978
- L'eau et les rêves (1942) (Water and Dreams, 1983)
- L'air et les songes (1943) (Air and Dreams, 1988)
- La terre et les rêveries de la volonté (1948) (Earth and Reveries of Will, 2002)
- La terre et les rêveries du repos (1948) (Earth and Reveries of Repose, 2011)
- Le Rationalisme appliqué (1949)
- L'activité rationaliste de la physique contemporaine (1951)
- Le matérialisme rationnel (1953)
- La poétique de l'espace (1957) (The Poetics of Space, 1964 and 2014)
- La poétique de la rêverie (1960) (The Poetics of Reverie: Childhood, Language, and the Cosmos, 1969)
- La flamme d'une chandelle (1961)
- L'engagement rationaliste (1972)

=== English translations ===
Though most of Bachelard's major works on poetics have been translated into English, only about half of his works on the philosophy of science have been translated.

- The Poetics of Space. Orion Press, New York, 1964. Translation by Maria Jolas. (La poétique de l'espace)
- The Psychoanalysis of Fire. Beacon Press, Boston, 1964. Translation by Alan C. M. Ross. Preface by Northrop Frye. (La Psychanalyse du Feu)
- The Philosophy of No: A Philosophy of the New Scientific Mind. Orion Press, New York, 1968. Translation by G.C. Waterston. (La philosophie du non)
- The New Scientific Spirit. Beacon Press, Boston, 1985. Translation by A. Goldhammer. (Le nouvel esprit scientifique)
- Dialectic of Duration. Clinamen, Bolton, 2000. Translation by M. McAllester Jones. (La dialectique de la durée)
- The Formation of the Scientific Mind. Clinamen, Bolton, 2002. Translation by M. McAllester Jones. (La formation de l'esprit scientifique)
- Intuition of the Instant. Northwestern University Press, 2013. Translation by Eileen Rizo-Patron (L'intuition de l'instant)
- Atomistic Intuitions. State University of New York Press, 2018. Translation by Roch C. Smith (Intuitions atomistiques)

== See also ==
- Dialectica

== Sources ==
- Dominique Lecourt, L’épistémologie historique de Gaston Bachelard (1969). Vrin, Paris, 11e édition augmentée, 2002.
- Dominique Lecourt, Pour une critique de l’épistémologie : Bachelard, Canguilhem, Foucault (1972, réed. Maspero, Paris, 5e éd. 1980).
- D. Lecourt, Marxism and Epistemology: Bachelard, Canguilhem and Foucault, New Left Books, London (1975).
- Dominique Lecourt, Bachelard, Epistémologie, textes choisis (1971). PUF, Paris, 6e édition, 1996.
- Dominique Lecourt, Bachelard, le jour et la nuit, Grasset, Paris, 1974.
- Didier Gil, Bachelard et la culture scientifique, Presses Universitaires de France, 1993.
- Didier Gil, Autour de Bachelard – esprit et matière, un siècle français de philosophie des sciences (1867–1962), Les Belles Lettres, Encre marine, 2010.
- Hommage à Gaston Bachelard. Etudes de philosophie et d'histoire des sciences, by C. Bouligand, G. Canguilhem, P. Costabel, F. Courtes, François Dagognet, M. Daumas, Gilles Granger, J. Hyppolite, R. Martin, R. Poirier and R. Taton
- Actes du Colloque sur Bachelard de 1970 (Colloque de Cerisy).
- L'imaginaire du concept: Bachelard, une épistémologie de la pureté by Françoise Gaillard, MLN, Vol. 101, No. 4, French Issue (Sep 1986), pp. 895–911.
- Gaston Bachelard ou le rêve des origines, by Jean-Luc Pouliquen, L'Harmattan, Paris, 2007.
