= Gaston Milhaud =

Gaston Milhaud (French: [mijo]; 10 August 1858, Nîmes – 1 October 1918, Paris) was a French philosopher and historian of science.

Gaston Milhaud studied mathematics with Gaston Darboux at the École Normale Supérieure. In 1881 he took a teaching post at the University of Le Havre. In 1891 he became professor of mathematics at Montpellier University, and in 1895 became professor of philosophy there. In 1909 a chair in the history of philosophy in its relationship to the sciences was created for him at the Sorbonne. Milhaud's successor in the chair was Abel Rey.

== Works ==
- Leçons sur les origines de la science grecque, Paris, F.Alcan, 1893
- Essai sur les conditions et les limites de la certitude logique, 1894
- Le rationnel: études complémentaires à l'Essai sur la certitude logique, 1898
- Les philosophes-géomètres de la Grèce, Platon et ses prédécesseurs, Paris, 1900
- Études sur la pensée scientifique chez les Grecs et chez les modernes, Paris, 1906
- Nouvelles études sur l'histoire de la pensée scientifique, 1910
- Descartes savant, Paris, 1921
- La philosophie de Charles Renouvier, 1927
- Études sur Cournot, 1927
