= Michel Villey =

French philosopher and historian

- Born: 4 April 1914; Caen, France
- Died: 24 July 1988 (aged 74); Bois-le-Roi, Seine-et-Marne, France
- Relatives: Émile Boutroux (grandfather)

Education
- Education: University of Paris (J.D., 1942)
- Doctoral advisor: Maurice Grandclaude

Philosophical work
- Institutions: University of Strasbourg; University of Paris; Panthéon-Assas University
- Doctoral students: Nicos Poulantzas
- Main interests: Philosophy of law (natural law)

Michel Villey (French: [vilɛ]; 4 April 1914 – 24 July 1988) was a French legal philosopher and historian. He was a professor at the University of Strasbourg and then at the University of Paris. He was born in Caen and was the grandson of philosopher Émile Boutroux. The Institut Michel-Villey is named in his honor.

== Publications ==
- Le droit et les droits de l'homme (PUF, Paris 1983).
