= The Poetics of Reverie =

1960 book by Gaston Bachelard

- Author: Gaston Bachelard
- Original title: La poétique de la rêverie
- Language: French
- Publisher: Presses Universitaires de France
- Publication date: 1960
- Publication place: France
- English publication date: 1969
- Pages: 187

The Poetics of Reverie: Childhood, Language, and the Cosmos (French: La poétique de la rêverie) is a 1960 book by the French writer Gaston Bachelard. It is about the relationship between the imagination of the consciousness and the world, approached from a phenomenological viewpoint. Bachelard highlights the dynamic nature of the reverie and draws from philosophy and natural science to meditate on imagination's influences from language, the subject, sexuality, childhood and the environment. He argues that the interconnection between memory, imagination and poetry is at the centre of all good writing and reading.

The Poetics of Reverie was one of Bachelard's last works and thematically followed The Poetics of Space, which is about the relationship between space and poetic imagery. Presses Universitaires de France published the original French edition. It was published in English translation through Beacon Press in 1969.
