= Itinerant Artist Project =

US-based art project

The Itinerant Artist Project (IAP) is a painting-based project with strong public outreach and performance art dimensions, devised and undertaken by Western NY landscape painter Jim Mott. The IAP is based on the principles of gift exchange discussed in Lewis Hyde's seminal work, the Gift. The project involves locating (by various means) a series of voluntary hosts around the USA, touring by car from host to host, and at each stop painting several small location paintings, offering one in exchange for the hospitality provided (room, board and occasional conversation for 2–5 days).

Motivated by a concern that the spheres of art and everyday life have become too disconnected, to the impoverishment of both, the IAP experiments with radically resituating the individual artist's painting practice, usually into the households of strangers. In collaboration with his hosts, Mott sets up a non-commercial but supportive context within which to operate. Mott sees this as a temporary but valuable break with social and professional convention—on the understanding that money, while ultimately necessary, distorts the relations between art and imagination, artist and public. Among other things, the project explores the function of art as a gift and the effect of a gift economy on creative productivity.

Since its beginning in the spring of 2000, there have been fifteen IAP tours, covering over 25,000 miles, with stops at approximately 125 locations in 35 states. In a total of thirteen months on the road, the IAP has generated over 550 small landscape paintings (oil on panel).

The IAP uses painting as a means of promoting, enhancing and celebrating direct human interaction in a virtual age. Although the project's focus is the integration of art into everyday life, primarily through situating the artist in other people's households for a sustained period, recent tours have involved spontaneous bartering, including the trading of art for meals, commercial lodging—and a speeding ticket in Missoula, MT.
