= Félix Ravaisson-Mollien =

French academic (1813–1900)

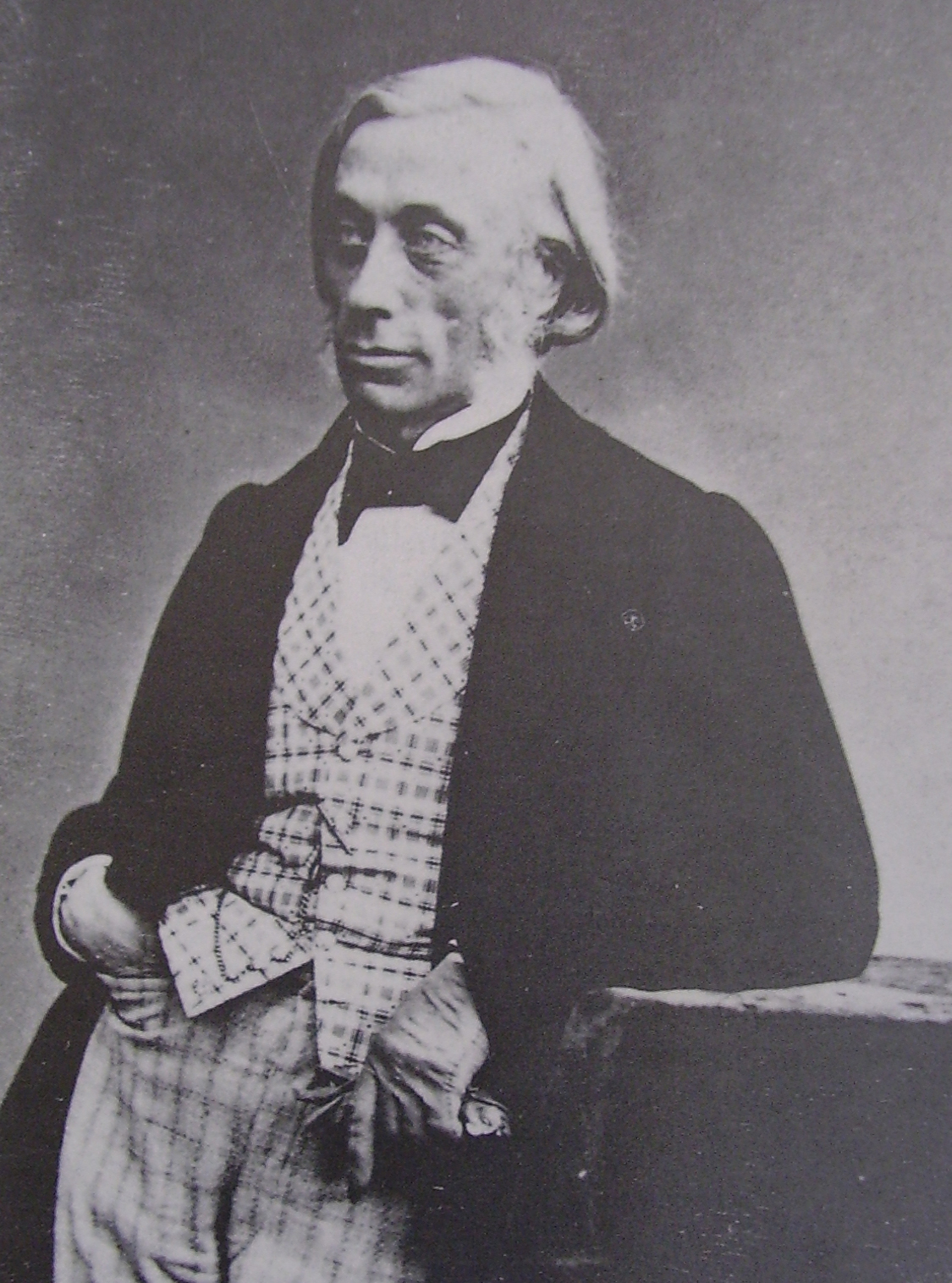
- Born: Jean Gaspard Félix Lacher Ravaisson-Mollien; 23 October 1813; Namur, French Empire
- Died: 18 May 1900 (aged 86); Paris, France

Education
- Education: Collège Rollin
- Alma mater: Ludwig-Maximilians-Universität München
- Academic advisor: Victor Cousin

Philosophical work
- Era: 19th-century philosophy
- Region: Western philosophy
- School: Continental philosophy French spiritualism
- Institutions: University of Rennes
- Doctoral students: Émile Boutroux; Jules Lachelier
- Main interests: Metaphysics; Positive Philosophie
- Notable ideas: Philosophy of habit, spiritual realism, criticism of French eclecticism

Jean Gaspard Félix Lacher Ravaisson-Mollien (/rɑːveɪˈsɒn/; French: [ʁavɛsɔ̃ mɔljɛ̃]; 23 October 1813 – 18 May 1900) was a French philosopher, 'perhaps France's most influential philosopher in the second half of the nineteenth century'. He was originally and remains more commonly known as Félix Ravaisson.

His seminal work was De l'habitude (1838), translated in English as Of Habit. Ravaisson's philosophy is in the tradition of French spiritualism, which was initiated by Pierre Maine de Biran (1766–1824) with the essay "The Influence of Habit on the Faculty of Thinking" (1802). However, Ravaisson developed his doctrine as what he called 'spiritual realism' and – according to Ravaisson scholar Mark Sinclair – can be thought of as founding 'the school of contingency'. His most well known and influential successor was Henri Bergson, with whom the tradition can be seen to end during the 1930s; although the 'lineage' of this 'philosophy of life' can be seen to return in the late twentieth century with Gilles Deleuze. Ravaisson never worked in the French state university system, in his late 20s declining a position at the University of Rennes. In 1838, he was employed as the principal private secretary to the minister of public instruction, going on to secure high-ranking positions such as inspector general of libraries, and then the curator of classical antiquities at the Louvre. Later in his life he was appointed as the president of the jury of the Aggregation of philosophy in France, 'a position of considerable influence'. Ravaisson, was not only a philosopher, classicist, archivist, and educational administrator, but also a painter exhibiting under the name Laché.

== Biography ==
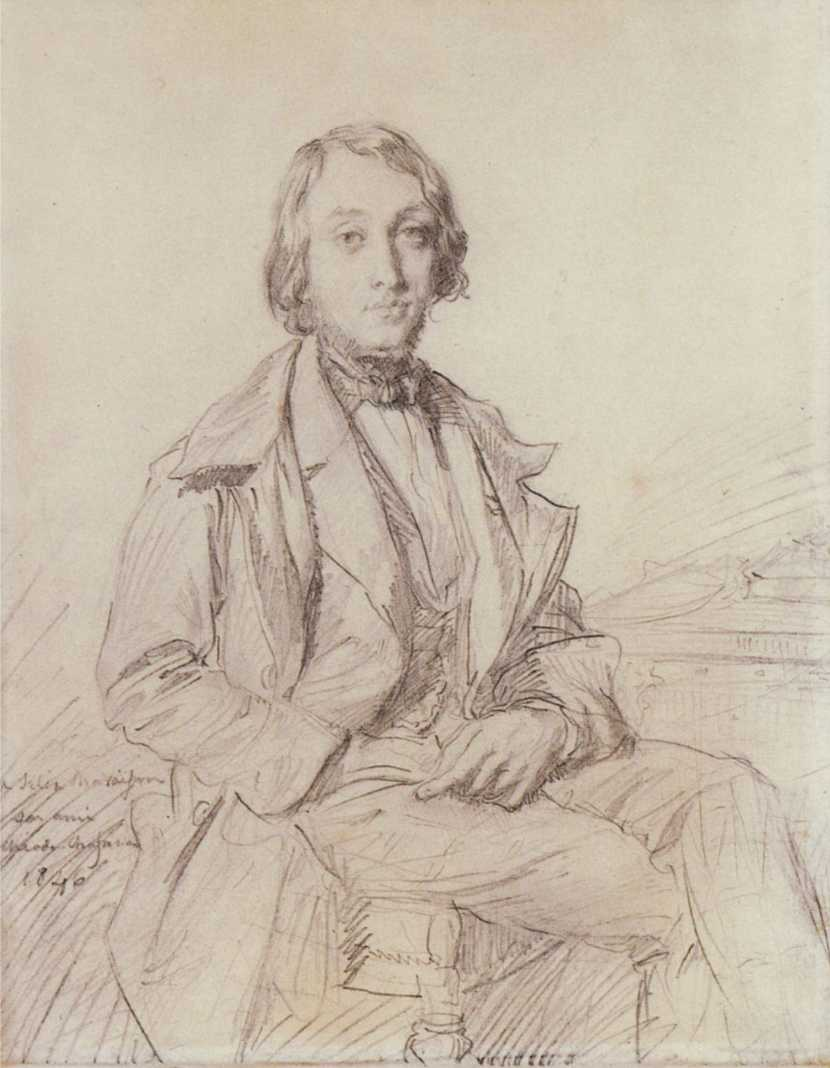
Félix Ravaisson by Théodore Chassériau (1846)

Ravaisson was born at Namur. After a successful course of study at the Collège Rollin, he went to the Ludwig-Maximilians-Universität München in autumn 1839, where he attended the lectures of Schelling, and took his degree in philosophy in 1836. In the following year he published the first volume of his famous work Essai sur la métaphysique d'Aristote ("Essay on the Metaphysics of Aristotle"), to which in 1846 he added a supplementary volume. This work not only criticizes and comments on the theories of Aristotle and the Peripatetics, but also develops from them a modern philosophical system.

In 1838, he received his doctorate, his thesis entitled De l'habitude (On Habit), which was to become a classic text (a metaphysical 'poem' on nature in general apprehended through an intuitive analysis of acquired habit as a particular manifestation of its essential being, much admired by Bergson and Heidegger), and became professor of philosophy at Rennes. From 1840, he was inspector-general of public libraries, and in 1860 became inspector-general in the department of higher education. He was also a member of the Academy of Moral and Political Sciences, and curator of the Department of Antiquities at the Louvre (from 1870). He died in Paris in 1900.

== Philosophical work ==
In philosophy, he was one of the school of Victor Cousin (Ravaisson was his disciple in his youth), with whom he was at issue in many important points. The act of consciousness, according to him, is the basis of all knowledge. Acts of consciousness are manifestations of will, which is the motive and creative power of the intellectual life. The idea of God is a cumulative intuition given by all the various faculties of the mind, in its observation of harmony in nature and in man. This theory had considerable influence on speculative philosophy in France during the later years of the 19th century.

== Bibliography ==
Ravaisson's 'complete' 'three major' philosophical works are: Essai sur la métaphysique d'Aristote [Vol. 1 & Vol. 2] (1837 and 1846); De l'habitude (On Habit, 1838); and Rapport sur la philosophie en France au XIXeme siècle (1867). Ravaisson also produced a number of other 'noteworthy essays' such as "La Philosophie contemporaine" ("Contemporary Philosophy", 1840); "La Philosophie de Pascale" ("Pascal’s Philosophy", 1887), and "Métaphysique et Morale" ("Metaphysics and Morals", 1893). Upon his death he also 'left unfinished fragments of a major work, which were published posthumously', first as "Testament philosophique" in Revue de métaphysique et de morale ("Philosophical Testament", 1901), then later in extended form as Testament philosophique (Philosophical Testament, 1933).

Year	Title	Original Publication Details	English Title	English Publication Details
1834	De la Métaphysique d'Aristote	Unpublished competition manuscript.^{[a]} Selections in De la nature à l’esprit, 2001.^{[b]}		
1837	Essai sur la Métaphysique d'Aristote [Vol. 1]^{[c]}	Paris: Imprimerie Royale, 1837.^{[d]}		
1838	De l'habitude	Sorbonne doctoral thesis (primary).^{[e]} Paris: H. Fournier, 1838.^{[f]}	Of Habit	(1) Trans. C Carlisle & M Sinclair:^{[g]} Of Habit, London & New York: Continuum, 2008.^{[h]} (2) Updated trans. M Sinclair: Félix Ravaisson: Selected Essays, 2016, p. 31–58.^{[i]}
1838	Speusippi de Primis Rerum Principiis Placita Qualia Fuisse Videantur ex Aristotele	Sorbonne doctoral thesis (secondary) [In Latin].^{[j]} Translated into French in 2012.^{[k]}		
1840	"La Philosophie contemporaine: Fragments de philosophie par M. Hamilton"	in La Revue des deux mondes, 1840, p.397–427.	"Contemporary Philosophy"	Trans. J Dunham: Félix Ravaisson: Selected Essays, 2016, p. 59–84.^{[l]}
1845	Essai sur la Métaphysique d'Aristote [Vol. 2]^{[m]}	Paris: Joubert, 1845.		
1854	De l'enseignement du dessin dans les lycées^{[n]}	Paris: Dupont, 1854.	"The Art of Drawing According to Leonardo da Vinci" [Part trans.]^{[o]}	Trans. M Sinclair: Félix Ravaisson: Selected Essays, 2016, p. 145–58
1856	"Mémoire sur le Stoïcisme"^{[p]}	in Mémoires de l'Institut Impériale de France, Académie des Inscriptions et Belle-Lettres, vol. XXI, 1857, p. 1-94.	"Essay on Stoicism"	Trans. A Efal and M Sinclair: Félix Ravaisson: Selected Essays, 2016, p. 85-144.
1867	La Philosophie en France au XIXème siècle^{[q]}	Paris: Hachette, 1867.		
1871	Venus de Milo [Version 1]^{[r]}	Paris: Hachette, 1871.^{[s]}		
1875	Les classiques de l'art: modèles pour l'enseignement du dessin	Paris: Rapilly, 1875^{[t]}		
1880	"Les monuments funéraires des Grecs"^{[u]}	in Revue politique et littéraire. Revue blue, 10 April 1880, vol. XVIII, p. 963-70.	"Greek Funerary Monuments"	Trans. M Sinclair: Félix Ravaisson: Selected Essays, 2016, p. 229-242.
1882	"L'enseignement du dessin d'après M. F. Ravaisson"	in Dictionnaire de pedagogie et d'instruction primaire Vol. 1, 1882; Paris: Hachette, p. 671-84.^{[v]}	"On the Teaching of Drawing"^{[w]}	Trans. T Viola and M Sinclair: Félix Ravaisson: Selected Essays, 2016, p. 159-188.
1887	"La Philosophie de Pascale"	in La Revue des deux mondes 80, 1887, p. 399–428.	"Pascal's Philosophy"^{[x]}	Trans. M Sinclair: Félix Ravaisson: Selected Essays, 2016, p. 253–78.
1892	"Les mystères. Fragment d'une étude sur l'histoire des religions"	in Revue politique et littéraire. Revue blue, 19 March 1892, p. 362-6.	"Mysteries: Fragment of a Study of the History of Religion"^{[y]}	Trans. M Sinclair: Félix Ravaisson: Selected Essays, 2016, p. 243-252.
1892	La Venus de Milo [Version 2]^{[z]}	in Mémoires de l'Académie des Inscriptions et Belle-Lettres, vol. XXXIV, Part 1, 1892, p. 145-256. also as off-prints by Klincksieck: Paris, 1892.	"Venus de Milo" [Part trans.]^{[aa]}	Trans. M Sinclair: Félix Ravaisson: Selected Essays, 2016, p. 189-228.
1893	"Métaphysique et morale"	in Revue de métaphysique et morale 1, 1893, 6–25.^{[bb]}	"Metaphysics and Morals"	Trans. M Sinclair: Félix Ravaisson: Selected Essays, 2016, p. 279–94.
1901	"Testament philosophique" [Original]^{[cc]}	Ed. Xavier Léon in Revue de métaphysique et de morale 9/1, 1901, p. 1–31.		
1933	Testament philosophique [Expanded]^{[cc]}	Ed. Charles Devivaise. Paris: Boivin, 1933.	"Philosophical Testament"	Trans. J Dunham and M Sinclair: Félix Ravaisson: Selected Essays, 2016, p. 295–336.
Notes: a Sinclair in Being Inclined: 'In 1834' when 21 years of age, Ravaisson 'was the remarkably young laureate of a competition organized by the Académie des sciences morales et politiques on Aristotle's Metaphysics and its historical reception, with a dissertation - De la Métaphysique d'Aristote - that he would later publish in a revised and expanded form as Essai sur la Métaphysique d'Aristote [Volume 1] (1837). See also Sinclair 'Introduction' in Félix Ravaisson: Selected Essays.; b Sinclair in Being Inclined: 'Long sections of' De la Métaphysique d'Aristote 'with the original pagination in the margins, are published in R. Belay and C. Marin, De la nature à l'esprit (Paris: ENS Editions, 2001), 201–13.'; c Revised and expanded version of Ravaisson's 1834 prize winning essay De la Métaphysique d'Aristote.; d See Sinclair in Being Inclined.; e See Sinclair in Being Inclined.; f See Sinclair's Félix Ravaisson: Selected Essays.; g As well as translating the text, Carlisle and Sinclair also included two extensive supplements by way of an "Editors’ Introduction" and "Editors’ Commentary". In addition, there is a long preface from Catherine Malabou titled "Addiction and Grace".; h This publication is a bilingual edition of the text and presents both De l'habitude and the translation by Carlisle and Sinclair (Of Habit) on facing pages of the book. The French version is the Alcan edition of 1933.; i Sinclair writes that the translation has been modified since the original translation by Carlisle and himself a few years earlier in Félix Ravaisson Of Habit (London/New York: Continuum, 2008).; j See Sinclair in Being Inclined.; k Translated as La doctrine de Speusippe sur les premiers principes selon le témoignage d'Aristote in Cahiers Philosophiques (n°129, 2ème trimestre), 2012; p. 68–96. Translation by Alain Petit, preceded by an introduction from Petit titled "Le symptôme Speusippe: le spectre de l'émanatisme dans la pensée métaphysique de Ravaisson" (2012).; l See also Sinclair's commentary in "Introduction" in Félix Ravaisson: Selected Essays.; m See Sinclair's commentary in "Introduction" in Félix Ravaisson: Selected Essays. Sinclair points out that this second volume developed (but did not repeat) work from his 1834 prize winning essay De la Métaphysique d'Aristote (1834) which had been revised and expanded in volume one (1837). Sinclair also mentions that a third and fourth volume were planned, but never came to fruition. In a footnote, however, Sinclair continues that Charles Devivaise 'published some of Ravaisson's work towards the third volume as Essai sur la Metaphysique d'Aristote: Fragments du Tome III (Paris: Vrin, 1953)'.; n This published text originally appeared as "Rapport addressé à M. le ministre de l'Instruction publique et des cultes" (28 December 1853). See Sinclair's commentary in "Introduction" in Félix Ravaisson: Selected Essays.; o This translation is of the first 'untitled' segment of the text. In a footnote, Sinclair writes: 'For reasons of economy, I follow Dominique Janicaud in L'Art et les mystères grecs (Paris: L'Herne, 1985) in producing just the first section of the report, but I alter his title L'Art et le dessin d'après Léonard da Vinci.'; p Original version presented as a paper to the Académie des Insciptions et Belle-Lettres in 1849 then 1851; this version extended for publication. See Sinclair's commentary in "Introduction" in Félix Ravaisson: Selected Essays. Published in 1856 with a cover date of 1877.; q See Sinclair's commentary in "Introduction" in Félix Ravaisson: Selected Essays.; r The first of two versions, the second reworked edition published in 1892. See Sinclair's commentary in "Introduction" in Félix Ravaisson: Selected Essays.; s Publication details.; t Originally written in 1854, and not published for 20 years. See Sinclair's commentary in "Introduction" in Félix Ravaisson: Selected Essays. Sinclair also has a footnote with further details.; u See Sinclair's commentary in "Introduction" in Félix Ravaisson: Selected Essays.; v This article was one of several that appeared under the heading "Dessin"; the volume was edited by Ferdinand Buisson.; w See Sinclair's commentary in "Introduction" in Félix Ravaisson: Selected Essays.; x See Sinclair's commentary in "Introduction" in Félix Ravaisson: Selected Essays.; y See Sinclair's commentary in "Introduction" in Félix Ravaisson: Selected Essays.; z The second of two versions, the first edition was published in 1871, and was subsequently reworked in this much later publication. See Sinclair's commentary in "Introduction" in Félix Ravaisson: Selected Essays.; aa The translation here is only part of the original article, the third and final section (p. 188-256).; bb Specially commissioned lead essay for the first issue of the journal. See Sinclair's commentary in "Introduction" in Félix Ravaisson: Selected Essays.; cc Posthumous publications from notes: see Sinclair's commentary in "Introduction" in Félix Ravaisson: Selected Essays.

== See also ==
- Jules Lachelier
- William of Champeaux

== Sources ==
Primary

- Sinclair, Mark. Being Inclined: Félix Ravaisson’s Philosophy of Habit (Oxford: Oxford University Press, 2019)

Secondary

- Carlisle, Clare. "Between Freedom and Necessity: Félix Ravaisson on Habit and the Moral Life", in Inquiry (43/2: 2010), p. 123–45
- Carlisle, Clare and Mark Sinclair. "Editors’ Introduction" and "Editors’ Commentary" in Félix Ravaisson Of Habit, translation, introduction, and commentary by Clare Carlisle and Mark Sinclair (London/New York: Continuum, 2008), p. 1-21; 78-114
- This article incorporates text from a publication now in the public domain: Chisholm, Hugh, ed. (1911). "Ravaisson-Mollien, Jean Gaspard Félix". Encyclopædia Britannica. Vol. 22 (11th ed.). Cambridge University Press. p. 922.
- Grosz, Elizabeth. "Habit Today: Ravaisson, Bergson, Deleuze and Us", in Body and Society (19/2–3: 2013), p. 217–39
- Malabou, Catherine. "Addiction and Grace: Preface to Félix Ravaisson’s Of Habit" in Félix Ravaisson Of Habit, translation, introduction, and commentary by Clare Carlisle and Mark Sinclair (London/New York: Continuum, 2008), p. vii-xx
- Sinclair, Mark. "Introduction" in Félix Ravaisson: Selected Essays, edited by Mark Sinclair; translated by Jeremy Dunham, Adi Efal, Mark Sinclair, Tullio Viola (London: Bloomsbury, 2016), p. 1-29
