= Jules Lachelier =

French philosopher (1832–1918)

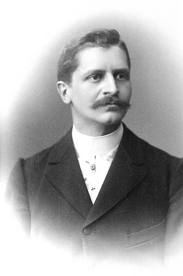
- Born: Jules Esprit Nicolas Lachelier; 27 May 1832; Fontainebleau, France
- Died: 26 January 1918 (aged 85); Fontainebleau, France
- Awards: Concours général (1850); Chevalier de la Légion d'honneur (1872); Officier de la Légion d'honneur (1888); Commandeur de la Légion d'honneur (1903)

Education
- Education: École Normale Supérieure; University of Paris (Ph.D., 1871)
- Doctoral advisor: Félix Ravaisson

Philosophical work
- Era: 20th-century philosophy
- Region: Western philosophy
- School: French spiritualism Lebensphilosophie
- Institutions: École Normale Supérieure
- Doctoral students: Émile Boutroux
- Main interests: Metaphysics, epistemology
- Notable ideas: Induction grounded in the mind's activity

Jules Esprit Nicolas Lachelier (French: [laʃəlje]; 27 May 1832 – 26 January 1918) was a French philosopher, most known for his contributions to French spiritualism and his influence on modern French philosophy. He developed a system of rational idealism and was a key figure in the neo-spiritualist movement in French philosophy.

His work focused on the relationship between thought and reality, and he attempted to provide a basis for induction in a philosophy of nature. Lachelier's ideas had a significant impact on other philosophers, including Émile Boutroux, Victor Brochard, and Henri Bergson.

== Philosophy ==
Defining himself as an intellectualist, Lachelier set himself on the mission of perpetuating the philosophy of Kant. One of his famous articles, Psychologie et Métaphysique, distinguishes him from Victor Cousin, and lays the foundations of his spiritualist-leaning philosophy.

Lachelier is influenced by Félix Ravaisson, from whom he borrowed the term "spiritual realism" to designate his philosophy. Henri Bergson dedicates his Time and Free Will to Jules Lachelier. Émile Meyerson discusses his theory of induction.

== Works ==
- Du fondement de l'induction suivi de Psychologie et Métaphysique, Alcan, 1896, in Gallica.
- Du fondement de l'induction suivi de Psychologie et Métaphysique et de Notes sur le pari de Pascal, Paris, Alcan, 1924.
- Œuvres, Paris, Librairie Félix Alcan, 1933
