= W. Lewis Hyde =

American physicist

- Born: 1919
- Died: January 9, 2003 (aged 83); Cambridge, Massachusetts
- Spouse: Elizabeth Sanford ()
- Children: 6, including Lewis Hyde

Academic background
- Education: Harvard University

Walter Lewis Hyde (1919 – January 9, 2003) was an American physicist, an early contributor to the field of fiber optics. He held patents for devices used in ophthalmology, as well as a panoramic rear-view mirror for automobiles.

Originally from Minnesota, he studied physics at Harvard University. He worked at the Polaroid Corporation in the nascent field of fiber optics. He married Elizabeth Sanford Hyde, and they had six children, including Lewis Hyde. In the 1950s, he worked for the London Office of Naval Research, tracking European physics research. He went on to become the director of development at the American Optical Company, in Southbridge, Massachusetts, and then a professor of optics at the University of Rochester. He then changed gears to administration, and served as provost of New York University until 1972. He served as president of the Optical Society of America in 1970

== Select publications ==
- Hyde, W. Lewis (1968). "Periscopes for Rear Vision". SAE Transactions. 77: 1339–1345. JSTOR 44565220.
- Hyde, W. Lewis (1967). "Development of Optics". Book Reviews. Science. New Series. 158 (3801): 622–623. doi:10.1126/science.158.3801.622.b. JSTOR 1722625.

== See also ==
- Optical Society of America#Past Presidents of the OSA
