= Abel Rey =

French philosopher (1873–1940)

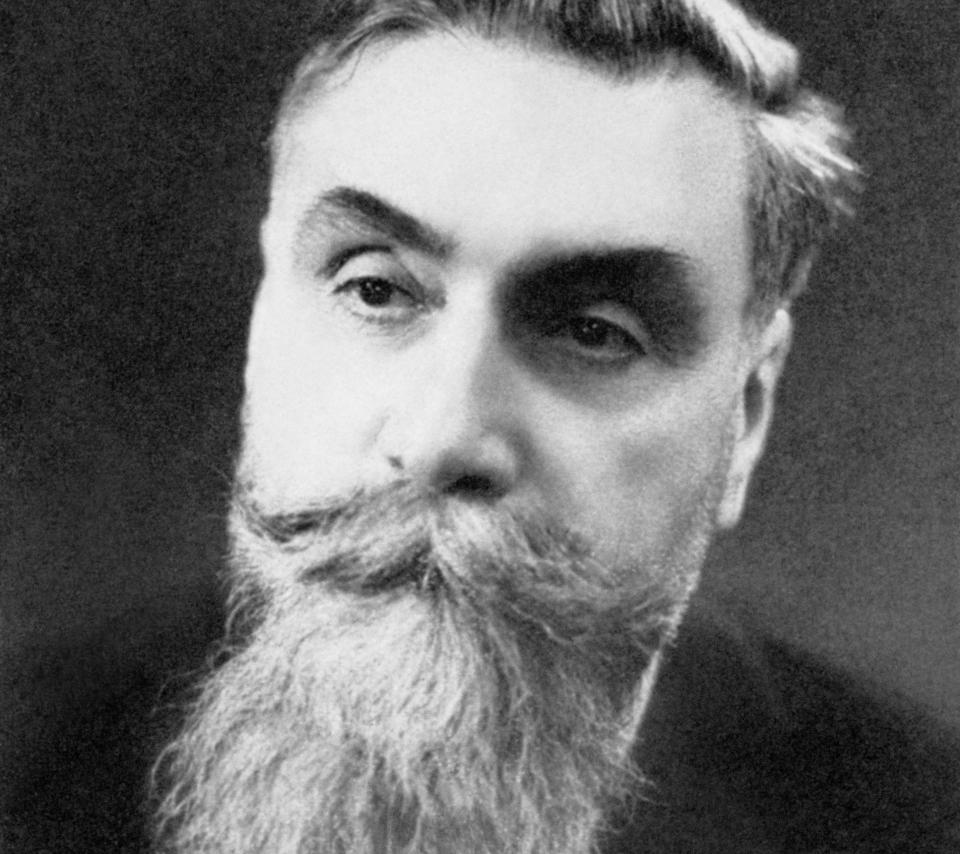

Abel Rey (French: [ʁɛ]; 29 December 1873, Chalon-sur-Saône – 13 January 1940, Paris) was a French philosopher and historian of science.

== Biography ==
Abel Rey first attended college in Marseilles, then at the Lycée Louis-le-Grand. He then studied philosophy under Émile Boutroux, and mathematics at Sorbonne, with Émile Picard and Paul Tannery as professors. After his bachelor in sciences, he succeeded a competition for professorship in philosophy. Like his friends Marcel Mauss and François Simiand, Rey was influenced by Lévy-Brühl's sociology and the planist views of Hubert Lagardelle.

Abel Rey then taught in a number of provincial colleges while writing his PhD thesis under the guidance of Émile Boutroux. This seminal work was dedicated to the confluent concepts of energy in modern physics.

Abel Rey succeeded Gaston Milhaud as professor of the history of philosophy in its relation to science at the Sorbonne, and established the Institut d'histoire des sciences et des techniques to encourage cooperation between the sciences and humanities. It has been argued that Rey influenced Philipp Frank and the formation of the Vienna Circle. Rey's history of science was wide, including sciences from physics to sociology, and deep, ranging from antiquity to the present; moreover, it included the study of culture's influence on the sciences of the time.

== Works ==
- L'énergétique et le mécanisme au point de vue des conditions de la connaissance, Paris, F. Alcan, 1905 (reprinted 1923)
- La théorie de la physique chez les physiciens contemporains, 1907
- La philosophie moderne, éd. Flammarion, 1908
- La science dans l'antiquité, dans L'évolution de l'humanité, vols. 1-5
  - La Science orientale avant les Grecs (1930)
  - La jeunesse de la science grecque (1933)
  - La maturité de la pensée scientifique en Grèce (1939)
  - L'apogée de la science technique grecque : les sciences de la nature; les mathématiques d'Hippocrate à Platon (1939)
  - L'apogée de la science technique grecque : l'essor des mathématiques (posthume, 1946)
- Psychologie, 1934
- Les mathématiques en Grèce, au milieu du Ve siècle, 1935
