= Dominique Lecourt =

French philosopher (1944–2022)

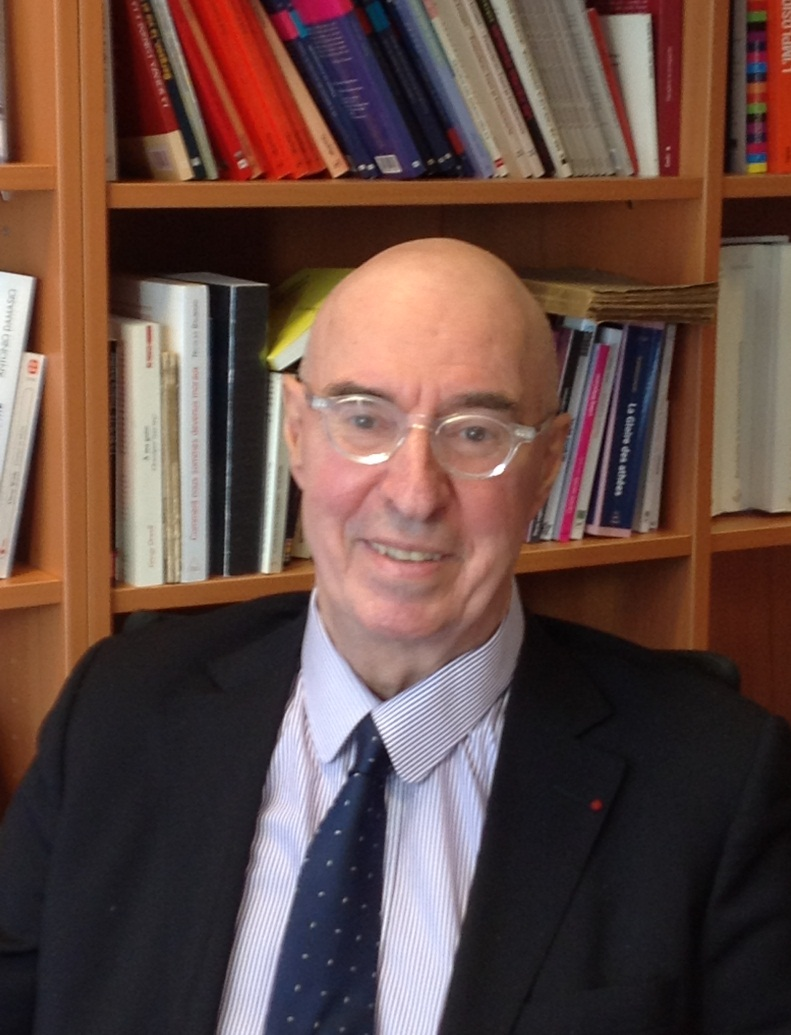
- Lecourt in 2013
- Born: Dominique Marie François Lecourt; 5 February 1944; Paris, German-occupied France
- Died: 1 May 2022 (aged 78); Paris, France
- Education: Lycée Buffon
- Alma mater: École normale supérieure Jean Moulin University Lyon 3
- Occupation: Philosopher

Dominique Marie François Lecourt (French: [dɔminik ləkuʁ]; 5 February 1944 – 1 May 2022) was a French philosopher. He is known in the Anglophone world primarily for his work developing a materialist interpretation of the philosophy of science of Gaston Bachelard.

== Biography ==
Lecourt was born in Paris. A former student at the École normale supérieure (1965), an agrégé in philosophy (1969), and a Docteur d'État ès lettres (1980), he was professor at the Université Paris Diderot-Paris 7 and, until 2011, was director of the Centre Georges Canguilhem (Paris 7).

Co-founder in 1984 of the International College of Philosophy, Rector of the National Center for Distance Education (1985–88), member of the Human Rights Commission of UNESCO (1977–90), member of the CNRS Ethics Commission for Life Sciences (1993–98), Chairman of the Ethics Commission of the French Research Development Institute (2002–2009).

Director General of the Institut Diderot and head of the surveillance council of Presses Universitaires de France (PUF), Dominique Lecourt has been decorated with the medals of Officer of the National Order of the Legion of Honour, Knight of the National Order of Merit, and has been awarded the Gegner Prize (2000) and Louis Marin Prize (2010) by the Academy of Political and Moral Sciences.

In addition to numerous publications in philosophy, philosophy of sciences, cloning, ethics, bioethics, and politics, Dominique Lecourt has published more than thirty books.

== Works in French ==
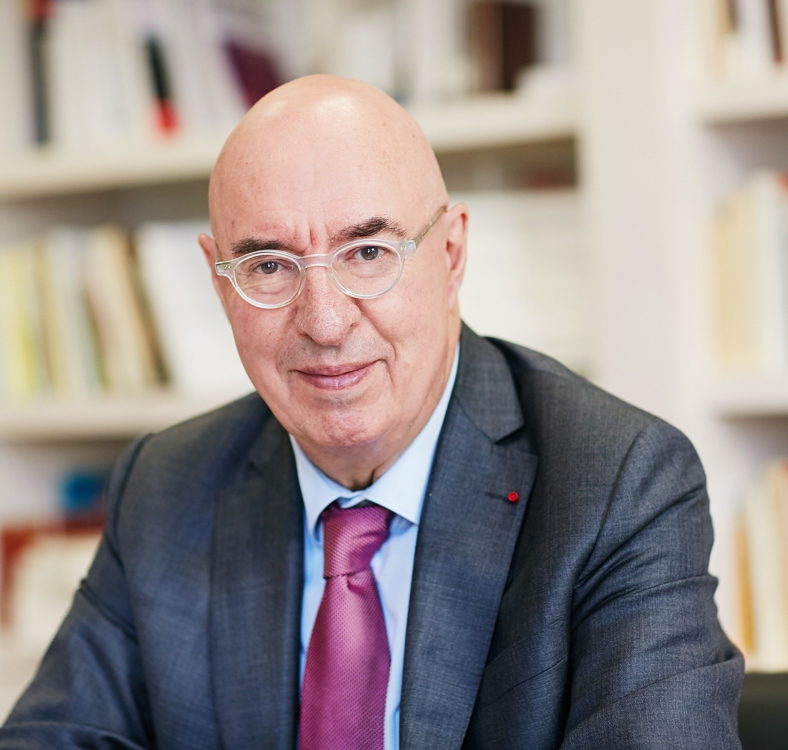
Dominique Lecourt par Kasia Kozinski 2015

- L’Épistémologie historique de Gaston Bachelard (1969, new edition Vrin, Paris, expanded 11th edition, 2002).
- Bachelard, épistémologie, textes choisis (1971, new edition PUF, Paris, 8th edition 2010).
- Pour une critique de l’épistémologie: Bachelard, Canguilhem, Foucault (1972, new edition Maspero, Paris, 5th edition 1980).
- Une Crise et son enjeu (Maspero, Paris, 1973).
- Bachelard, le jour et la nuit (Grasset, Paris, 1974).
- Lyssenko, histoire réelle d’une "science prolétarienne" (1976, new edition Quadrige/PUF, 1995) :
- Dissidence ou révolution? (Maspero, Paris, 1978).
- L’Ordre et les Jeux (Grasset, Paris, 1980).
- La Philosophie sans feinte (Albin Michel, Paris, 1982).
- Contre la peur. De la science à l’éthique une aventure infinie (1990, 4th edition Quadrige/PUF, 2007).
- L’Amérique entre la Bible et Darwin, suivi de Intelligent design: science, morale et politique (1992, 3rd edition Quadrige/PUF, 2007).
- À quoi sert donc la philosophie? Des sciences de la nature aux sciences politiques (PUF, Paris, 1993).
- Les Infortunes de la raison (Vents d’Ouest, Québec, 1994).
- Prométhée, Faust, Frankenstein: Fondements imaginaires de l’éthique (1996, new edition Livre de Poche/Biblio Essai, 1998).
- L’Avenir du progrès (Editions Textuel, Paris, 1997).
- Déclarer la philosophie (PUF, Paris, 1997).
- Science, Philosophie et Histoire des sciences en Europe, edited by D. Lecourt (1998, new edition European Commission, Brussels, 1999).
- Encyclopédie des sciences, edited by D. Lecourt (Livre de Poche, Paris, 1998).
- Les Piètres penseurs (Flammarion, Paris, 1999).
- Dictionnaire d’histoire et philosophie des sciences, edited by D. Lecourt (1999, 4th edition Quadrige/PUF, Paris, 2006).
- Sciences, Mythes et Religions en Europe, edited by D. Lecourt (European Commission, Brussels, 2000).
- Rapport au ministre de l’Éducation nationale sur l’enseignement de la philosophie des sciences (2000). Translated by Judith Sanitt and Julia Sanitt :
- La Philosophie des sciences (2001, 4th edition PUF/Que sais je?, Paris, 2008).
- Humain post-humain (PUF, Paris, 2003).
- Dictionnaire de la pensée médicale, edited by D. Lecourt (2004 edition PUF/Quadrige, Paris, 2004).
- Bioéthique et Liberté with Axel Kahn (PUF/Quadrige essai, Paris, 2004).
- La Science et l'Avenir de l'homme, edited by D. Lecourt (PUF/Quadrige essai, Paris, 2005).
- L’Erreur médicale, edited by C. Sureau, D. Lecourt, G. David (PUF/Quadrige essai, Paris, 2006).
- Georges Canguilhem (Paris, PUF/Que sais je ?, 2008).
- Charles Darwin. Origines - Lettres choisies 1828-1859, edited by D. Lecourt (Bayard, Paris, 2009). ISBN 978-2-227-47843-5.
- L'âge de la peur : Science, éthique et société (Bayard, Paris, 2009). ISBN 2-227-47850-0.
- La mort de la clinique ?, sous la direction de D. Lecourt, G. David, D. Couturier, J-D. Sraer, C. Sureau (PUF/Quadrige essai, Paris, 2009). ISBN 978-2-13-057973-1.
- La santé face au principe de précaution, sous la direction de D. Lecourt (2009, réed. PUF, Paris, 2010). ISBN 978-2-13-057721-8.

=== Selected translations ===
- Marxism and epistemology: Bachelard, Canguilhem and Foucault (New Left Books, 1975).
- Proletarian Science? The Case of Lysenko (1977). Translation by Ben Brewster, 2nd edition, Schocken Books, 1978. Digital edition, 2003 :
- The Mediocracy: French Philosophy Since the Mid-1970s (Verso, 2001, 2nd edition, 2002).
