= Pierre Boutroux =

French mathematician and historian of science

Pierre Léon Boutroux
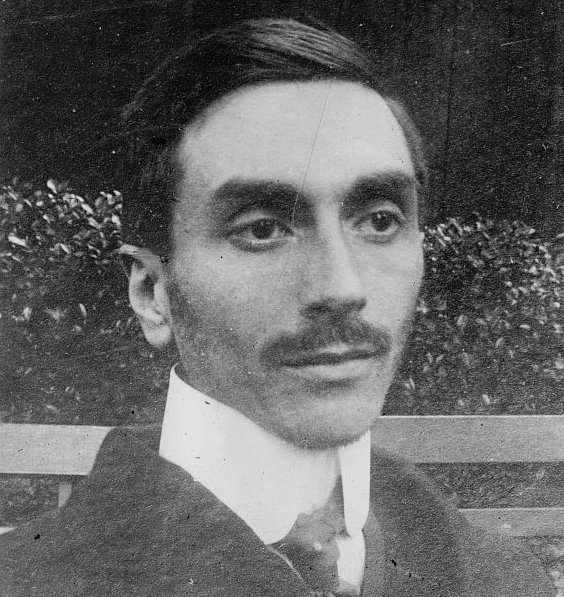
- Born: 6 December 1880; Paris, France
- Died: 15 August 1922 (aged 41); Paris, France
- Scientific career
- Fields: Mathematics
- Thesis: Sur quelques propriétés des fonctions entières (1903)

Pierre Léon Boutroux (French: [butʁu]; 6 December 1880 – 15 August 1922) was a French mathematician and historian of science. Boutroux is chiefly known for his work in the history and philosophy of mathematics.

== Biography ==
He was born in Paris on 6 December 1880 into a well connected family of the French intelligentsia. His father was the philosopher Émile Boutroux. His mother was Aline Catherine Eugénie Poincaré, sister of the scientist and mathematician Henri Poincaré. A cousin of Aline, Raymond Poincaré was to be President of France.

He occupied the mathematics chair at Princeton University from 1913 until 1914. He occupied the History of sciences chair from 1920 to 1922.

Boutroux published his major work Les principes de l'analyse mathématique in two volumes; Volume 1 in 1914 and Volume 2 in 1919. This is a comprehensive view of the whole field of mathematics at the time.

He was an Invited Speaker of the ICM in 1904 at Heidelberg, in 1908 at Rome, and in 1920 at Strasbourg.

He died on 15 August 1922, aged 41 years.

== Works ==
- L'Imagination et les mathématiques selon Descartes (1900)
- Sur quelques propriétés des fonctions entières (1903)
- Œuvres de Blaise Pascal, publiées suivant l'ordre chronologique, avec documents complémentaires, introductions et notes, par Léon Brunschvicg et Pierre Boutroux (1908)
- Leçons sur les fonctions définies par les équations différentielles du premier ordre, professées au Collège de France (1908)
- Les Principes de l'analyse mathématique, exposé historique et critique (2 volumes, 1914-1919) Texte en ligne 1 2

Contient : (I) Les nombres, les grandeurs, les figures, le calcul combinatoire, le calcul algébrique, calcul des fonctions, l'algèbre géométrique. (2) La géométrie algébrique. Extensions de l'algèbre et constructions logiques. Extensions de l'algèbre; les développements en séries. La méthode analytique en mathématiques. Analyse infinitésimale. Analyse des principes mathématiques. Analyse de la notion de fonction.

- L'Idéal scientifique des mathématiciens dans l'antiquité et dans les temps modernes (1920) Texte en ligne
- Les Mathématiques (1922)
