= Émile Boutroux =

French philosopher and historian (1845–1921)

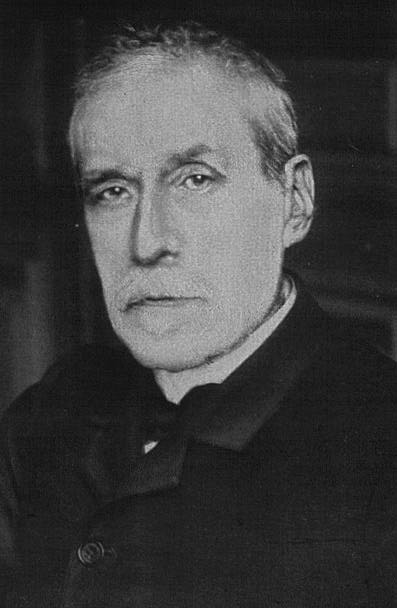
- Born: Étienne Émile Marie Boutroux; 28 July 1845; Montrouge, Seine, France
- Died: 22 November 1921 (aged 76); Paris, France
- Relatives: Michel Villey (grandson)

Education
- Education: École Normale Supérieure; Heidelberg University; University of Paris (Ph.D., 1874)
- Doctoral advisor: Jules Lachelier; Félix Ravaisson

Philosophical work
- Era: 19th-century philosophy
- Region: Western philosophy
- School: French spiritualism
- Institutions: University of Nancy; University of Paris
- Doctoral students: Maurice Blondel; Léon Brunschvicg; Victor Delbos; Émile Durkheim; Lucien Lévy-Bruhl; Abel Rey
- Main interests: Philosophy of religion
- Notable ideas: Religion and science as compatible The contingent character of the laws of nature

Étienne Émile Marie Boutroux (/buːˈtruː/; French: [butʁu]; 28 July 1845 – 22 November 1921) was a French philosopher of science and a historian of philosophy. He was a firm opponent of materialism in science. He was a spiritualist philosopher who defended the idea that religion and science are compatible at a time when the power of science was rising inexorably. His work is overshadowed in the English-speaking world by that of the more celebrated Henri Bergson. He was elected membership of the Académie des Sciences Morales et Politiques in 1898 and in 1912 to the Académie française.

== Biography ==
Émile Boutroux was born on 28 July 1845, at Montrouge near Paris. He attended the lycée Napoléon (now lycée Henri IV), and graduated in 1865 to the École Normale Supérieure. He then continued his education at Heidelberg University between 1869 and 1870 where he was taught by Hermann von Helmholtz and encountered German philosophy. In 1874, he defended two doctoral theses: one, "De Veritatibus aeternis apud Cartesium" ("On Eternal Truths According to Descartes"), under the supervision of Félix Ravaisson; and the other, "De la contingence des lois de la nature" ("The Contingency of the Laws of Nature"), under Jules Lachelier.

His first employment was the post of philosophy professor at the lycée in Caen.

Between 1874 and 1876, Boutroux taught at the Faculty of Letters at the University of Nancy, and while there, he fell in love with and married Aline Poincaré, the sister of the scientist and mathematician Henri Poincaré. In 1880, his son, Pierre, was born. Pierre Boutroux was himself to become a distinguished mathematician and historian of science.

In 1888, Boutroux was made professor of the history of modern philosophy at the Sorbonne in Paris.

He was elected a member of the Academy of the Moral and Political Sciences in 1898, and in 1902, he became Director of the Thiers Foundation. He was elected to the Académie Française in 1912.

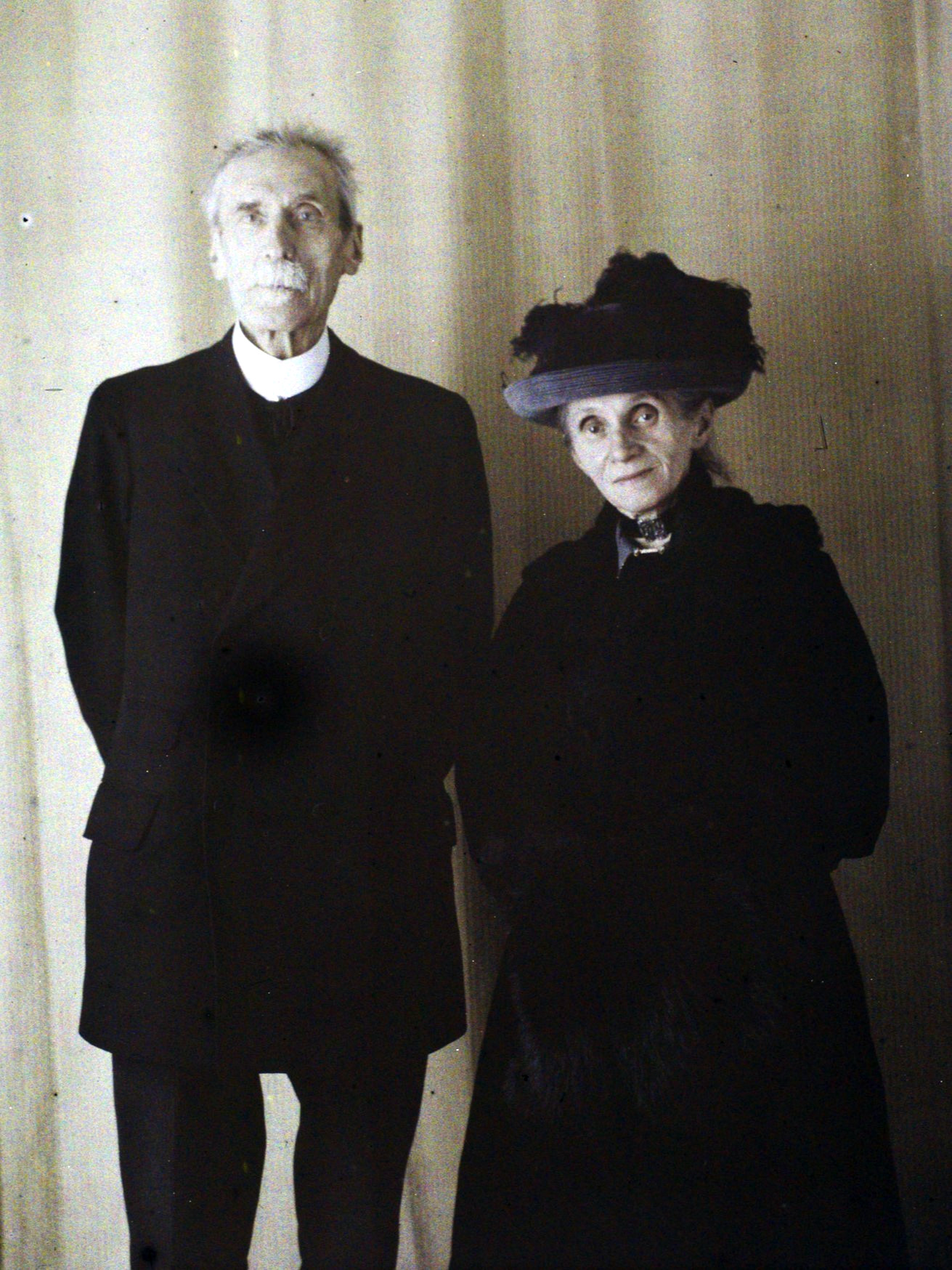
Boutroux and his wife, 1917 Autochrome by Auguste Léon

Boutroux died on 22 November 1921, aged 76, in Paris.

== Works ==
- De la Contingence des Lois de la Nature (1874).
- De Veritatibus Æternis apud Cartesium (1874; translated into French by G. Canguilhem, Des Vérités Éternelles Chez Descartes, Paris: Alcan, 1927; Paris: Vrin-Reprise, 1985).
- La Grèce Vaincue et les Premiers Stoïciens (1875).
- La Monadologie de Leibnitz (1881).
- Socrate, Fondateur de la Science Morale (1883).
- Les Nouveaux Essais, de Leibnitz (1886).
- Questions de Morale et d'Éducation (1895).
- De l'Idée de Loi Naturelle dans la Science et la Philosophie Contemporaines (1895).
- Études d'Histoire de la Philosophie (1897).
- Du Devoir Militaire à Travers les Âges (1899).
- Pascal (1900).
- Essais d'Histoire de la Philosophie (1901).
- La Philosophie de Fichte. Psychologie du Mysticisme (1902).
- Science et Religion dans la Philosophie Contemporaine (1908).
- William James (1911).

Translations

- La Philosophie des Grecs, by Eduard Zeller (1877–1884).

Posthumous

- La Nature et l'Esprit (1925).
- Études d'Histoire de la Philosophie Allemande (1926).
- La Philosophie de Kant (1926).
- Nouvelles Études d'Histoire de la Philosophie (1927).
- Leçons sur Aristote (1990).

Works in English translation

- Pascal (1902, trans. by Ellen Margaret Creak).
- William James (1911, trans. by Archibald & Barbara Henderson).
- Science and Religion in Contemporary Philosophy (1911, trans. by Jonathan Nield).
- Historical Studies in Philosophy (1912, trans. by Fred Rothwell).
- Education and Ethics (1913, trans. by Fred Rothwell).
- Science and Culture (1914, lecture).
- Natural Law in Science and Philosophy (1914, trans. by Fred Rothwell).
- The Contingency of the Laws of Nature (1916, trans. by Fred Rothwell).
- Philosophy and War (1916, trans. by Fred Rothwell).
- The Relation Between Thought and Action (1918, lecture).

Selected articles

- "War and Sophistry," The New England Magazine, Vol. LV, June 1916.
- "A Frenchman on America," The Open Court, Vol. XXXII, No. 749, 1918.

== See also ==
- Conventionalism
- Neo-Kantianism
