= The Gift: Imagination and the Erotic Life of Property =

1983 book by Lewis Hyde

- First edition
- Author: Lewis Hyde
- Language: English
- Publisher: Random House (hardbound); Vintage Books (paperback)
- Publication date: 1983
- ISBN: 0-394-71519-5

The Gift: Imagination and the Erotic Life of Property is a 1983 book by Lewis Hyde, in which the author examines the importance of gifts, their flow and movement and the impact that the modern market place has had on the circulation of gifts. Classified as economic anthropology, some reviewers have seen it as a work of metaphysics (the branch of philosophy concerned with understanding the basics of reality, such as questions of cause and effect).

Part of part I, "A Theory of Gifts", was originally published as "The Gift Must Always Move" in Co-Evolution Quarterly No. 35 in fall 1982.

== Other editions and translations ==
The book has been republished with alternative subtitles,. A 2006 printing appeared with the subtitle "How the Creative Spirit Transforms the World" and a 2007 printing as "Creativity and the Artist in the Modern World". The twenty-fifth anniversary 2007 edition contains a new preface and afterword.

It has been translated into Italian (2005, ISBN 88-339-1629-4), German (2008, ISBN 978-3-10-031840-4), Chinese (2008, ISBN 978-986-124-922-3), Japanese (2002, ISBN 4-588-49020-6) and Turkish (2007, ISBN 978-975-342-684-8).

== See also ==
- Gift economy
