= Lewis Hyde =

American writer (born 1945)

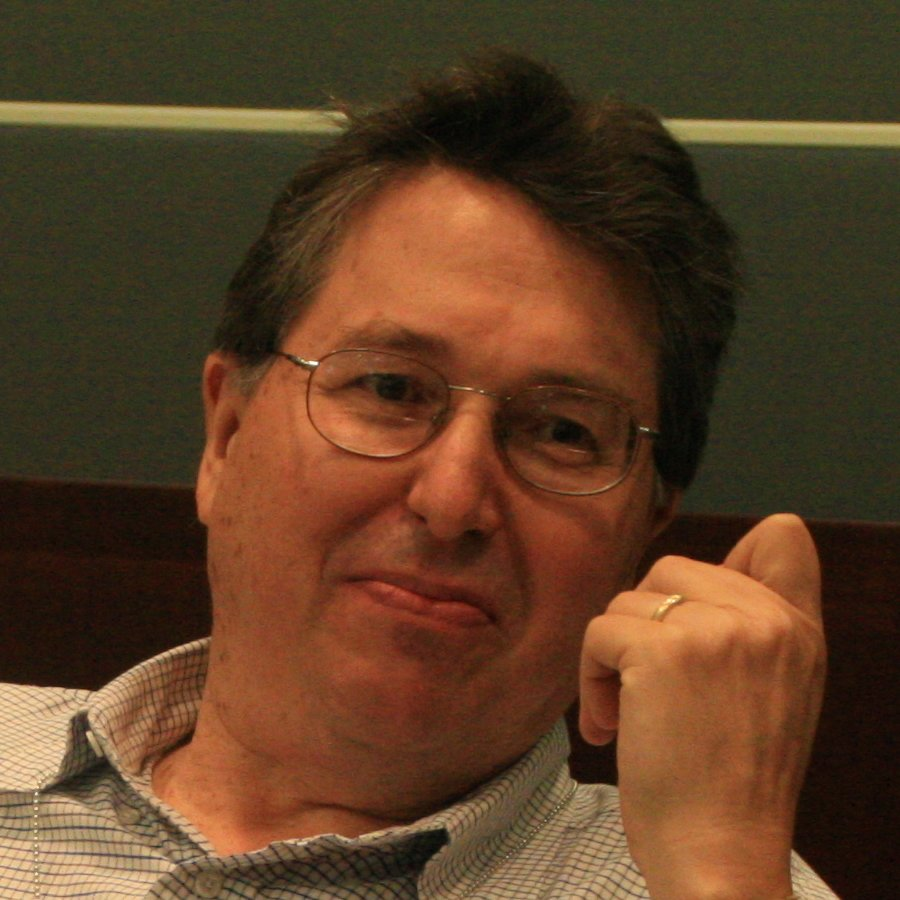
- Born: 1945 (age 80–81); Boston, Massachusetts, U.S.
- Occupations: Author; poet; scholar
- Known for: The Gift; Trickster Makes this World; Common as Air: Revolution, Art, and Ownership
- Spouse: Patricia Vigderman
- Website: lewishyde.com

Lewis Hyde (born 1945) is an American scholar, essayist, translator, cultural critic and writer whose scholarly work focuses on the nature of imagination, creativity, and property.

== Early life and education ==
Hyde was born in Boston, Massachusetts. He is the son of Elizabeth Sanford Hyde and Walter Lewis Hyde. He received an M.A. in comparative literature from the University of Iowa and a B.A. in sociology from the University of Minnesota after which there were many years of freelance work and odd jobs, before teaching writing in the 80s.

== Career ==
Hyde taught writing at Harvard University (1983–1989); in his last year there, he directed the undergraduate writing program. From 1989 to 2001 he was the Luce Professor of Arts and Politics at Kenyon College in Ohio. Beginning in 2006 he served as the Richard L. Thomas Professor of Creative Writing at Kenyon, and a visiting fellow at Harvard's Berkman Center. He is also a Nonresident Fellow at the USC Annenberg Center for Communication. He has since retired.

Hyde's popular works of scholarship, including the books The Gift (1983) and Trickster Makes this World (1998), have been widely praised by writers of fiction, including Margaret Atwood, Michael Chabon, Jonathan Lethem and David Foster Wallace. The Gift has also been cited as the inspiration for visual artist Jim Mott's Itinerant Artist Project. Robert Darnton in The New York Times called Hyde's book, Common as Air: Revolution, Art and Ownership (Farrar, Straus & Giroux, 2010), "an eloquent and erudite plea for protecting our cultural patrimony from appropriation by commercial interests." His latest book is A Primer for Forgetting: Getting Past the Past (Farrar, Straus and Giroux: New York, 2019).

== Awards ==
Hyde's awards include an NEH Fellowship for Independent Study and Research (1979); three NEA Creative Writing Fellowships (1977, 1982, 1987); a MacArthur Fellowship (often called "the MacArthur genius grant") (1991); a residency at the Getty Center, Los Angeles (1993–94); an "Osher Fellow" at the Exploratorium in San Francisco (1998); a Lannan Literary Fellowship (2002); an American Council of Learned Societies Fellowship (2003); a Guggenheim Foundation Fellowship (2006), and multiple MacDowell Colony Fellowships (1988, 1991, 1993, 1996, 1999, 2000, 2003, 2005, 2007, 2008, 2012, and 2018).

== Personal life ==
Hyde is married to Patricia Vigderman. The couple divide their time between Gambier, Ohio and Cambridge(where?).

== Published works ==
=== As author ===
- The Gift: Imagination and the Erotic Life of Property (1983) (republished in 2007 with the alternative subtitle "Creativity and the Artist in the Modern World")
- On the Poetry of Allen Ginsberg (Under Discussion) (1985)
- Alcohol and Poetry: John Berryman and the Booze Talking (1986)
- This Error is the Sign of Love: Poems (1988) Milkweed Editions
- "Elegy for John Cage" (1993) Kenyon Review 15 (3): 55-56
- "American Memory, American Forgetfulness + Heritage and History" (1997) Kenyon Review 19 (1): U1-U4
- "2 ACCIDENTS, REFLECTIONS ON CHANCE AND CREATIVITY" (1996) Kenyon Review 18 (3-4): 19-35
- "The Land of the Dead" (1996) Kenyon Review 18 (1): 27-34
- "Prophecy" (an excerpt from Trickster Makes This World)" (1998) American Poetry Review 27 (1): 45-55
- Created Commons (Paper Series) (1998)
- Trickster Makes This World: Mischief, Myth and Art (1998) (republished in 2008 with the alternative subtitle How Disruptive Imagination Creates Culture)
- "Henry Thoreau, John Brown, and the Problem of Prophetic Action" (excerpted from the introduction to The Essays of Henry D. Thoreau) (2002) Raritan - A Quarterly Review 22 (2): 125-144
- Posts at On The Commons blog
- Common As Air: Revolution, Art and Ownership (2010)
- A Primer for Forgetting: Getting Past the Past (2019)

=== As editor ===
- A Longing for the Light: Selected Poems of Vicente Aleixandre (1979; Copper Canyon Press, 2007)
- The Essays of Henry David Thoreau (2002)

=== Multiple roles ===
- Twenty Poems, by Vicente Aleixandre (1979). Translated by Hyde and Robert Bly. Edited by Hyde.
