= John R. Stilgoe =

American historian and photographer

- Born: 1949 (age 76–77); Norwell, Massachusetts
- Education: Boston University; Purdue University
- Occupations: Writer, professor
- Notable work: Common Landscape of America, 1580 to 1845

John Robert Stilgoe (born 1949) is an American historian and photographer who is the Robert and Lois Orchard Professor in the History of Landscape at the Visual and Environmental Studies Department of Harvard University, where he has been teaching since 1977. He is also a fellow of the Society of American Historians. He was featured on a 60 Minutes episode in 2004 entitled "The Eyes Have It".

== Biography ==
Stilgoe was born in Norwell, Massachusetts in 1949. His father was a boatbuilder. He graduated from Boston University with a B.A. in 1971, and from Purdue University with an M.A. in 1973. He entered Harvard's Ph.D. program in American Civilizations in 1973, where he studied under J. B. Jackson, a landscape essayist known for his studies of vernacular American landscapes.

== Educational philosophy ==
On his Harvard Faculty of Arts and Sciences website, Stilgoe comments,

Education ought to work outdoors, in the rain and the sleet, in the knife-like heat of a summertime Nebraska wheat field, along a half-abandoned railroad track on a dark autumn afternoon, on the North Atlantic in winter. All that I do is urge my students and my readers to look around, to realize how wonderfully rich is the built environment, even if the environment is only a lifeboat close-hauled in a chiaroscuro sea.

== Awards ==
- Francis Parkman Prize, 1983
- George Hilton Medal
- Bradford Williams Medal, 1984
- American Institute of Architects award for collaborative research
- Charles C. Eldredge prize for art-history research

== Bibliography ==
- What is Landscape? (MIT Press, 2015)
- Old Fields: Photography, Glamour, and Fantasy Landscape (University of Virginia Press, 2014)
- Train Time: Railroads and Imminent Landscape Change (University of Virginia Press, 2007)
- Landscape and Images (University of Virginia Press, 2005)
- Lifeboat: A History of Courage, Cravenness, and Survival at Sea (University of Virginia Press, 2003)
- Outside Lies Magic (Walker & Company, 1998)
- Alongshore (Yale University Press, 1994)
- Shallow-Water Dictionary: A Grounding in Estuary English (Princeton Architectural Press, 1990, 2nd ed. 2003)
- Borderland: Origins of the American Suburb, 1820-1939 (Yale University Press, 1990)
- Metropolitan Corridor: Railroads and the American Scene (Yale University Press, 1983)
- Common Landscape of America, 1580 to 1845 (Yale University Press, 1983)
