= Voigny =

Commune in Grand Est, France

- Commune
- Coat of arms
- Location of Voigny
- Location within France Location within Grand Est
- Coordinates: 48°14′29″N 4°46′07″E
- Country: France
- Region: Grand Est
- Department: Aube
- Arrondissement: Bar-sur-Aube
- Canton: Bar-sur-Aube
- Intercommunality: Région de Bar-sur-Aube

Government
  - Mayor (2020–2026): Philippe Barbieux
- Area^{1}: 7.09 km^{2} (2.74 sq mi)
- Elevation: 200 m (660 ft)
- Highest elevation: 319 m (1,047 ft)
- Lowest elevation: 172 m (564 ft)
- Population (2023): 141
  - Density: 19.9/km^{2} (51.5/sq mi)
- Time zone: UTC+01:00 (CET)
  - Summer (DST): UTC+02:00 (CEST)
- INSEE/Postal code: 10440 /10200
- ^{1} French Land Register data, which excludes lakes, ponds, glaciers > 1 km^{2} (0.386 sq mi or 247 acres) and river estuaries.

Voigny (French pronunciation: [vwaɲi]) is a commune in the Aube department in north-central France.

== Population ==
Historical population
Year	Pop.	±% p.a.
1968	165	—
1975	166	+0.09%
1982	217	+3.90%
1990	217	+0.00%
1999	195	−1.18%
2007	187	−0.52%
2012	176	−1.21%
2017	158	−2.13%
2023	141	−1.88%
Source: INSEE

== See also ==
- Communes of the Aube department
