= Malcolm Turvey =

British film scholar

Malcolm Turvey (born February 1969) is a British film scholar. He is currently Sol Gittleman Professor in the Department of the History of Art & Architecture at Tufts University, and was the founding Director of Tufts's Film & Media Studies program (2015-2021). He previously taught at Sarah Lawrence College (2000-2015) and the University of Wisconsin, Madison (1999-2000). He has been an editor of the journal October since 2001 and also serves on the editorial board of Projections: The Journal for Movies and Mind. He is a longtime board member of the Society for the Cognitive Study of the Moving Image, and was a faculty fellow at Stanford University's Humanities Center in 2011-2012, and at Tufts's Center for the Humanities in 2024-2025.

== Early life and education ==
Turvey was born in Barnet in North London, and grew up in nearby Finchley. He attended the University of Kent at Canterbury, where he earned a BA in Film Studies and English, and an MA in Film Studies. After moving to the States in 1992, he earned a PhD in Cinema Studies from New York University, where he studied primarily with avant-garde film scholar Annette Michelson and philosopher of film Richard Allen. Other notable film scholars who have influenced his work include David Bordwell and Noël Carroll.

== Scholarship ==
Turvey works primarily in the areas of film theory, the philosophy and aesthetics of film, avant-garde film, and film and modernism. His work is deeply informed by analytic philosophy, and his first book, Wittgenstein, Theory, and the Arts (Routledge, 2001), co-edited with Richard Allen, explores the implications of Wittgenstein's later philosophy for the study of film and the other arts. An exchange about these implications between Turvey and film scholar David Rodowick was published in October in 2007, and Turvey has recently been interviewed about the book's legacy. Turvey's first monograph, Doubting Vision: Film and the Revelationist Tradition (Oxford University Press, 2008), employs the techniques of ordinary language philosophy to elucidate and criticize a strain of classical film theory Turvey refers to as "revelationism." Focusing on the film theories of Jean Epstein, Dziga Vertov, Béla Balázs, and Siegfried Kracauer, the book helped reignite scholarly interest in classical film theory and introduce film scholars to the tradition of ordinary language philosophy as practiced by Wittgenstein, Gilbert Ryle, Anthony Kenny, and others.

Turvey's work is also informed by cognitive psychology and cognitive film theory, although he believes there are significant limits to the kinds of questions about film and the other arts that can be answered by psychology and other sciences. He explores these limits in his most recent monograph, Film, Art, and the Limits of Science: In Defence of Humanistic Explanation (Palgrave Macmillan, 2025), where he mounts a trenchant defence of the purpose and value of humanistic explanation, one that nevertheless acknowledges and welcomes the legitimate contribution of the sciences to the study of the arts. In 2020, David Bordwell published a section of this book criticizing some mirror neuron research on cinema as a guest entry on his blog. There followed an exchange of views between Turvey and proponents of mirror neuron research on cinema, Vittorio Gallese and Michele Guerra.

Turvey is also a scholar of modernism and avant-garde film, about which he has written two monographs. The Filming of Modern Life: European Avant-Garde Film of the 1920s (MIT Press, 2011), published as part of the October Books series, examines five canonical avant-garde films from the 1920s and the complex, sometimes contradictory, attitudes toward modernity they express: Rhythm 21 (Hans Richter, 1921), Ballet mécanique (Dudley Murphy and Fernand Léger, 1924), Entr'acte (Francis Picabia and René Clair, 1924), Un chien Andalou (Salvador Dalí and Luis Buñuel, 1929), and Man with a Movie Camera (Dziga Vertov, 1929). It also criticizes the "modernity thesis" propounded by Walter Benjamin, Tom Gunning, and others. The book was a highly recommended Kraszna-Krausz Moving Image Book in 2012.

Meanwhile, Play Time: Jacques Tati and Comedic Modernism (Columbia University Press, 2019)—the first English-language book on Jacques Tati in several decades—analyzes Tati’s unique comedic style and evaluates its significance for the history of film and modernism. Considering films such as Monsieur Hulot’s Holiday (1953), Mon Oncle (1958), Play Time (1967), and Trafic (1971), Turvey shows how Tati drew on the rich legacy of comic silent film while modernizing its conventions in order to encourage his viewers to adopt a playful attitude toward the modern world. The book was named a Choice Outstanding Academic Title in 2020.

As a longtime editor of October, Turvey has edited numerous special issues and clusters of essays for the journal including, most recently, "Notes for Wavelength" [October 184 (Spring 2023)] in honor of legendary experimental filmmaker Michael Snow. Other special issues and essay clusters include: "Special Issue in Honor of Annette Michelson," co-edited with Rachel Churner, October 169 (Summer 2019); "Comedy and the Avant-Garde," October 160 (Spring 2017); "A Return to Classical Film Theory?" October 148 (Spring 2014); "Experimental Digital Cinema," October 137 (Summer 2011); "New Vertov Studies," co-edited with Annette Michelson, October 121 (Summer 2007); "Béla Balázs," October 115 (Winter 2006); "Michael Snow," October 114 (Fall 2005); "Hollis Frampton," October 109 (Summer 2004); and "The Projected Image in American Art of the 1960s and 1970s," October 103 (Winter 2003).

On the occasion of her retirement from New York University, Turvey co-edited, with Richard Allen, the festschrift in honor of Annette Michelson, one of the founding editors of October. In addition to the introduction to the festschrift, Turvey has published several essays about Michelson's seminal work.

== Personal life ==
Turvey lives in Massachusetts with his wife and son. He plays the violin, and was a longtime member of the Brooklyn Symphony Orchestra.

== Books ==
- Wittgenstein, Theory, and the Arts, ed. Richard Allen and Malcolm Turvey (London: Routledge, 2001)
- Camera Obscura, Camera Lucida: Essays in Honor of Annette Michelson, ed. Richard Allen and Malcolm Turvey (Amsterdam: University of Amsterdam Press, 2003)
- Doubting Vision: Film and the Revelationist Tradition, Malcolm Turvey (New York: Oxford University Press, 2008)
- The Filming of Modern Life: European Avant-Garde Film of the 1920s, Malcolm Turvey (Cambridge, MA: MIT Press, 2011)
- Play Time: Jacques Tati and Comedic Modernism, Malcolm Turvey (New York: Columbia University Press, 2019)
- Film, Art, and the Limits of Science: In Defence of Humanistic Explanation, Malcolm Turvey (London: Palgrave Macmillan, 2025)

== Articles ==
Turvey is the author of over 75 articles, including:

- "Empathy: On Its Limitations and Liabilities," in What is Film Good For? Varieties of Ethical Experience in Cinematic Spectatorship, ed. Julian Hanich and Martin P. Rossouw (Los Angeles: University of California Press, 2023), pp. 91–101.
- "The Medium Matters! In Defense of Medium-Specificity in Classical Film Theory," in The Oxford Handbook of Film Theory, ed. Kyle Stevens (New York: Oxford University Press, 2022), pp. 95–116.
- "Cinematic Specificity, Intermediality, and the European Avant-Garde," in A Companion to Experimental Cinema, ed. Federico Windhausen (Hoboken, NJ: Wiley-Blackwell, 2022), pp. 40–58.
- "Parallelism and Complex Storytelling in Film and TV," in Contemporary Television: Cognition, Emotion and Aesthetics, ed. Ted Nannicelli and Héctor J. Pérez (New York: Routledge, 2022), pp. 214–33.
- "Jacques Tati and the Philosophy of the Sight Gag," in Philosophy of Humor Yearbook, volume 2 (Berlin: de Gruyter Publishing, 2021), pp. 27–44.
- "(Collapsed) Seeing-In and the (Im-)Possibility of Progress in Analytic Philosophy (of Film)," in Philosophy and Film: Bridging Divides, ed. Steven Gouveia, Diana Neiva, and Christina Rawls (New York: Routledge, 2019), pp. 11–25.
- "Avant-Garde Film as Philosophy," in The Palgrave Handbook for the Philosophy of Film and Motion Pictures, ed. Noël Carroll, Laura T. Di Summa-Knoop, Shawn Loht (London: Palgrave Macmillan, 2019), pp. 573–600.
- "'Familiarity Breeds Contempt': Why Fascination, Rather than Repeat Exposure, Better Explains the Appeal of Antiheroes on Television," in Screening Characters: Theories of Character in Film, Television, and Interactive Media, ed. Aaron Taylor and Johannes Riis (New York: Routledge, 2019), pp. 231–47.
- "Kaufman and Kopalin’s Moscow," in The City Symphony Phenomenon: Cinema, Art, and Urban Modernity Between the Wars, ed. Steven Jacobs, Eva Hielscher, and Anthony Kinik (New York: Routledge, 2018), pp. 76–85.
- "Against Post-Cinema," with Ted Nannicelli, Cinéma & Cie: International Film Studies Journal XVI, nos. 26/27 (Spring/Fall 2016), pp. 33–44.
- "Epstein, Sound and the Return to Classical Film Theory," Mise au Point no. 8 (2016); translated into French and reprinted in Jean Epstein: Actualité et Postérités, ed. Roxane Hamery et Éric Thouvenel (Presses Universitaires de Rennes, 2016), pp. 153–66.
- "Vertov, the View from Nowhere, and the Expanding Circle," October 148 (Spring 2014), pp. 79–102.
- "The Continuity of Narrative Comprehension," Projections: The Journal for Movies and Mind 6, no. 1 (Summer 2012), pp. 49–56.
- "Ken Jacobs: Digital Revelationist," October 137 (Summer 2011), pp. 107–24.
- "Hitchcock, Unreliable Narration, and the Stalker Film," in The Hitchcock Annual, ed. Richard Allen and Sidney Gottlieb (New York: Columbia University Press, 2010), pp. 153–78.
- "Arnheim and Modernism," in Arnheim for Film and Media Studies, ed. Scott Higgins (London: Routledge, 2010), pp. 31–49.
- "Persistence of Vision: On the Films of Chantal Akerman," Artforum 46, no. 9 (November 2008), pp. 312–14.
- "Theory, Philosophy, and Film Studies: A Response to D. N. Rodowick's 'An Elegy for Theory,'" October 122 (Fall 2007), pp. 110–20; reprinted in Film Theory Reader: Debates and Arguments, ed. Marc Furstenau (London: Routledge, 2010), pp. 38–46.
- "Vertov: Between the Organism and the Machine," October 121 (Summer 2007), pp. 5–18.
- "Fiction, Imagination, and Simulation," Film Studies: An International Review 8 (Summer 2006), pp. 116–25.
- "Dr. Tube and Mr. Snow," Millennium Film Journal 43-44 (Summer 2005), pp. 131–40.
- "The Child in the Machine: On the Use of CGI in Michael Snow's *Corpus Callosum," October 114 (Fall 2005), pp. 29–42; reprinted in Michael Snow, ed. Annette Michelson and Kenneth White (Cambridge, MA: MIT Press, 2019), pp. 181–196.
- "Can Scientific Models of Theorizing Help Film Theory?" in Philosophy of Film: Introductory Texts and Readings, ed. Angela Curran and Tom Wartenberg (London: Blackwell, 2004), pp. 21–32.
- "Philosophical Problems Concerning the Concept of Pleasure in Psychoanalytical Theories of (the Horror) Film," in Freud's Worst Nightmares, ed. Stephen Schneider (Cambridge: Cambridge University Press, 2004), pp. 68–83.
- "'A Neutral . . . Average Way of Looking at Things': The Films of Babette Mangolte," Framework 45, no. 1 (Spring 2004), pp. 70–84.
- "Is Skepticism a Natural Possibility of Language? Reasons to be Skeptical of Cavell's Wittgenstein," in Wittgenstein, Theory and the Arts, ed. Richard Allen and Malcolm Turvey (London: Routledge, 2001), pp. 117–36.
- "Can the Camera See? Mimesis in Man with a Movie Camera," October 89 (Summer 1999), pp. 25–50.
- "Seeing Theory: On Perception and Emotional Response in Current Film Theory," in Film Theory and Philosophy, ed. Richard Allen and Murray Smith (Oxford: Clarendon Press, 1997), pp. 431–57.
