= Cinema 1: The Movement Image =

1983 book by Gilles Deleuze

- Cover of the French edition
- Author: Gilles Deleuze
- Original title: Cinéma 1. L'image-mouvement
- Translator: Hugh Tomlinson; Barbara Habberjam
- Language: French
- Subjects: Philosophy; Film theory
- Published: 1983 (Les Éditions de Minuit)
- Publication place: France
- Media type: Print
- Pages: 296
- ISBN: 2-7073-0659-2
- OCLC: 11089931
- Preceded by: Francis Bacon - Logique de la sensation (1981)
- Followed by: Cinéma 2. L'image-temps (1985)

Cinema 1: The Movement Image (French: Cinéma 1. L'image-mouvement) (1983) is the first of two books on cinema by the philosopher Gilles Deleuze, the second being Cinema 2: The Time Image (French: Cinéma 2. L'image-temps) (1985). Together Cinema 1 and Cinema 2 have become known as the Cinema books, the two volumes both complementary and interdependent. In these books the author combines philosophy and cinema, explaining in the preface to the French edition of Cinema 1 that "[t]his study is not a history of cinema. It is a taxonomy, an attempt at the classifications of images and signs"; and that the "first volume has to content itself with […] only one part of the classification". To make this division between the movement-image and the time-image Deleuze draws upon the work of the French philosopher Henri Bergson's theory of matter (movement) and mind (time).

In Cinema 1, Deleuze specifies his classification of the movement-image through both Bergson's theory of matter and the philosophy of the American pragmatist C. S. Peirce. The cinema covered in the book ranges from the silent era to the late 1970s, and includes the work of D. W. Griffith, G. W. Pabst, Abel Gance, and Sergei Eisenstein from the early days of film; mid-20th century filmmakers such as Akira Kurosawa, John Ford, Carl Theodor Dreyer, and Alfred Hitchcock; and contemporary – for Deleuze – directors Robert Bresson, Werner Herzog, Martin Scorsese, and Ingmar Bergman. The second volume includes the work of a different series of filmmakers (although there are some overlaps).

Claire Colebrook writes that while both books are clearly about cinema, Deleuze also uses films to theorise – through movement and time – life as a whole. David Deamer writes that Deleuze's film philosophy "is neither the site of a privileged discourse by philosophy on film, nor film finding its true home as philosophy. Neither discipline needs the other. Yet together philosophy and film can create […] an atmosphere for thought."

== Toward the movement-image ==
The first four chapters of Cinema 1 concentrate upon and create correspondences between Henri Bergson's philosophy of movement (matter) and time (mind) and the basic compositional concepts of cinema: the frame, the shot, and montage.

=== Bergson and cinema ===
Deleuze begins Cinema 1 with the first of four commentaries on Bergson's philosophy (of which the second two are in Cinema 2). That Deleuze should begin with Bergson can be seen as rather curious. In the first place, as Christophe Wall-Romana states, while 'Bergson was the first thinker to develop a philosophy in which cinema played a determinate role', the philosopher's position on cinema is also widely interpreted as 'negative'. In the second place, as Mark Sinclair explains in Bergson (2020), despite the philosopher and his philosophy being very popular during the early years of the twentieth century, his ideas had been critiqued and then rejected first by phenomenology, then by existentialism, and finally by post-structuralism. 'Against this background', comments Sinclair, 'Gilles Deleuze's return to Bergson in the 1950s and 1960s looks all the more idiosyncratic'. As Sinclair goes on to explain, over a series of publications including Bergsonism (1966) and Difference and Repetition (1968), Deleuze championed Bergson as a thinker of 'difference that proceeds any sense of negation'. In this way, 'Deleuze's interpretation served to keep the flame of Bergson's philosophy alive' – and Deleuze returned to Bergson again and again throughout his later work, nowhere more so than in the Cinema books.

Deleuze, commenting on Bergson's philosophy in his most well known text, Creative Evolution (1907), challenges Bergson's conception of cinema as an illusion formed from a succession of still photographs. Instead, he invokes Bergson's earlier book Matter and Memory (1896) to argue that cinema immediately gives us images in movement (a movement-image). Images are not described in a unique moment; rather, the continuity of movement describes the image. In this respect, cinema embodies a modern conception of movement, "capable of thinking the production of the new", as opposed to the ancient conception of movement as a succession of separate elements where "'all is given'", exemplified by Zeno's arrow. The capacity for thinking the production of the new is a consequence of "modern science", which requires "another philosophy" which Bergson sets out to provide, and with which Deleuze concurs. However, asks Deleuze, "can we stop once we have set out on this path? Can we deny that the arts must also go through this conversion or that the cinema is an essential factor in this, and that it has a role to play in […] this new way of thinking?"

Deleuze illustrates such claims by turning to the birth of the cinematograph, to the Lumière brothers and Charlie Chaplin. Whereas the Lumières saw no future in filmmaking, Chaplin (and others) saw its capacity for giving the world a new kind of artform. This new capacity was also arising in painting, dance, ballet, and mime, which "were abandoning figures and poses" to be open to "any-instant-whatever" and "any-location-whatever". Deleuze, citing film writer Jean Mitry, sees Chaplin as giving "mime a new model, a function of space and time, a continuity constructed at each instant […] instead of being related to prior forms which it was to embody" as well as happening "in the street, surrounded by cars, along a pavement".

=== Frame ===
That which is within the frame (characters, sets, props, colours, and even implicit sound) is a relatively closed system, and can be treated as a purely spatial composition. However, it can never be completely closed. Deleuze writes: "The frame teaches us that the image is not just given to be seen. It is legible as well as visible […] if we see very few things in an image, this is because we do not know how to read it properly". The implications of this are most apparent in the relation between what is in-the-frame and the out-of-frame. All framing determines an out-of-field, but for Deleuze there are "two very different aspects of the out-of-field". One aspect is what can be intuited (the continuity of the image within the frame, the sound moments that create a world beyond the frame); the other is a "more disturbing presence" in that it does not really exist in the space of the frame - it is time, thought, emotion, life, the whole." The whole is "the Open, and relates back to time or even to spirit rather content and to space." This is particularly apparent in the films of Dreyer which gives us spirit, Michelangelo Antonioni which gives us emptiness, and Hitchcock which gives us thought.

=== Shot ===
Deleuze defines the shot not only that which captures and releases the movement of data (characters, and so on) but also through the movements of the camera. The mobile camera thus acts as a general equivalent to forms of locomotion (for instance walking, planes, cars). These two aspects of the shot are similar to the two conceptions of the out-of-field in the frame. The great moments of cinema are often when the camera, following its own movement, turns its back on a character. In this way, the camera acts as a mechanical consciousness in its own right, separate from the consciousness of the audience or the characters within the film. The shot is change, duration, time. For instance, Kurosawa "has a signature [movement] which resembles a fictitious Japanese character […] such a complex movement relates to the whole of the film". Shots can be composed using depth of field, superimposition, and tracking – and all of these aspects embrace multiplicity which is the hallmark of time.

=== Montage ===
Montage (the way the shots are edited) connects shots and gives even more movement. Different conceptions of duration and movement can be seen in the four distinct schools of montage: the organic montage of the American school, the dialectic montage of the Soviet school, the quantitative montage of the pre-war French school and the intensive montage of the German expressionist school. The American school, exemplified in Griffith, relies on oppositions (rich/poor, men/women), but attempts to give to them the unity in a whole. The Soviet school, in particular Eisenstein, sees montage as developmental and revolutionary: opposite ideas giving birth to something new. Pre-war French montage puts the emphasis on psychology through superimposition and flowing camera movements. German expressionist montage emphasises dark and light and is essentially a montage of visual contrasts. Deleuze concludes: "The only generality about montage is that it puts the cinematographic image into a relationship with the whole; that is with time conceived as the Open. In this way it gives an indirect image of time" – this is the movement-image. We can see there must be different types of movement-image each giving us different values, meanings, conceptions of time, being, becoming, life and the world. The question becomes how can these different types be specified and differentiated?

== Types of movement-image ==
The second part of Cinema 1 concerns Deleuze's classification of types of movement-image. Bergson's thesis of movement is that of an entangled human body and brain in the world of matter where perceptions cause affects and where affects cause actions. The body and brain is thus an accumulation of habitual memories. However, at one and the same time, for the human (as the human has evolved and as every human grows), habitual memories are multiple, contradictory, and paradoxical. This means that perceptions no longer wholly determine affects, and affects no longer wholly determine actions. The body and brain becomes a "centre of indetermination".

Deleuze sees a correspondence between Bergson's philosophy of movement and the cinematic medium. There are thus four types of cinematic movement-images:

- perception-images (that focus on what is seen)
- affection-images (that focus on expressions of feeling)
- action-images (that focus on behaviours and changing the world)
- mental-images (that focus upon the multiplicities of habitual memory)

As David Rodowick – who wrote the first commentary on Deleuze's Cinema books – summarises, the movement-image will "divide" when it is "related to a center of indetermination […] according to the type of determination, into perception-images, affection-images, action-images, and relation-images". The first three images are associated, respectively, with long shots, close-ups and medium shots; while "the memory-image, the mental-image, the relation-image" will "derive" from the three other types. As Deleuze writes, with the memory-image "action, and also perception and affection, are framed in a fabric of relations. It is this chain of relations which constitutes the mental image, in opposition to the thread of actions, perceptions and affections".

=== Perception images ===
Poster for Vertov's Cinema Eye (1924)

"[I]f the cinematographic perception-image consequently passes from the subjective to the objective, and vice versa, should we not ascribe to it a specific, diffuse, supple status […]?"

The perception-image creates characters and worlds within the film. The perception-image is thus the way in which the characters are perceived and perceive. The perception-image can vary from the subjective point of view shot to the semi-subjective (as if seen by someone) to floating free becoming an anonymous, unidentified viewpoint of the camera (a camera consciousness).

There are three different types of perception for Deleuze: solid perception (normal human perception), liquid perception (where images flow together, such as in pre-War French cinema), and gaseous perception (the pure vision of the non-human eye: which is achieved through foregrounding montage). Gaseous perception is objective vision, the vision of matter, of the world before humans or at least not dependent upon human vision. Dziga Vertov's images aspire to such pure vision, as does experimental cinema. Deleuze's division of the perception-image into three signs (solid, liquid, and gaseous) comes from Bergson's conditions of perception in Matter and Memory. Gaseous perception is the genesis of all perception-images where there are a multiplicity of images with no centre; with liquid perception multiple centres form and flow from one to another; while solid perception composes a unitary subjective centre to which all other images relate.

The perception-image is the condition for all the other images of the movement-image: "perception will not constitute a first type of image in the movement-image without being extended into the other types, if there are any: perception of action, of affection, of relation, etc". This means that each of the other images will also have three signs corresponding to solid, liquid and gaseous perception.

=== Affection images ===
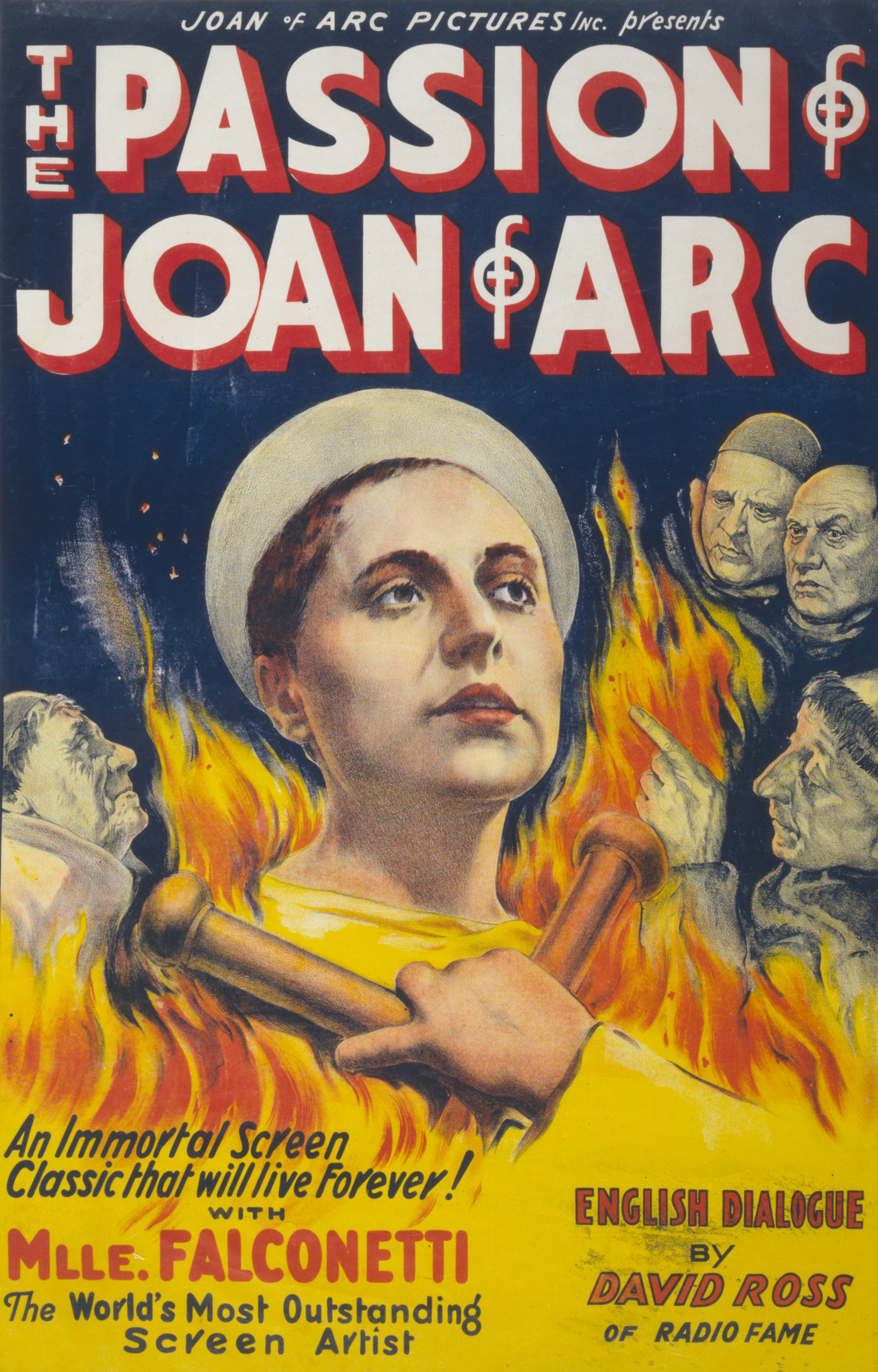
Poster for Dreyer's The Passion of Joan of Arc (1928)

"The affection-image is the close-up, and the close-up is the face..."

A character in the film is perceived and perceives – and then will act. However, there is an interval between perception and action: affects. Bodies are affected by the world, and then act upon the world. There will be thus be types of shots which take affects as their subject matter. The most familiar type of affective shot is of the face. The close-up. Some films, such as Dreyer's The Passion of Joan of Arc (1928) are composed from a series of close-ups, and in this way create an affection-image film. The affection-image film is therefore a film which foregrounds emotions: desires, wants, needs. These emotions arise from images of faces which communicate the unfilmable intensive effects of the characters.

This type of affection-image corresponds to the sign of solid perception of the perception-image and is called the "icon". There will then be types of affection-images and affection-image films which correspond to liquid and gaseous perception. These are named the "dividual" and "any-space-whatevers". The sign of the dividual is seen in films by Eisenstein which film collective emotions of the mass. Any-space-whatevers are most usually seen in backgrounds, and when they become the focus of the film can be landscapes or city-spaces, or using aspects of cinema such as color and lighting. Deleuze gets the idea of the any-space-whatever from Pascal Augé, who "would prefer to look for their source in the experimental cinema. But it could equally be said that they are as old as cinema itself". These are non-human affects: "a place of ruin, all-encompassing rain, the lens flare of sunshine, the shimmering of heat haze".

=== Action images ===
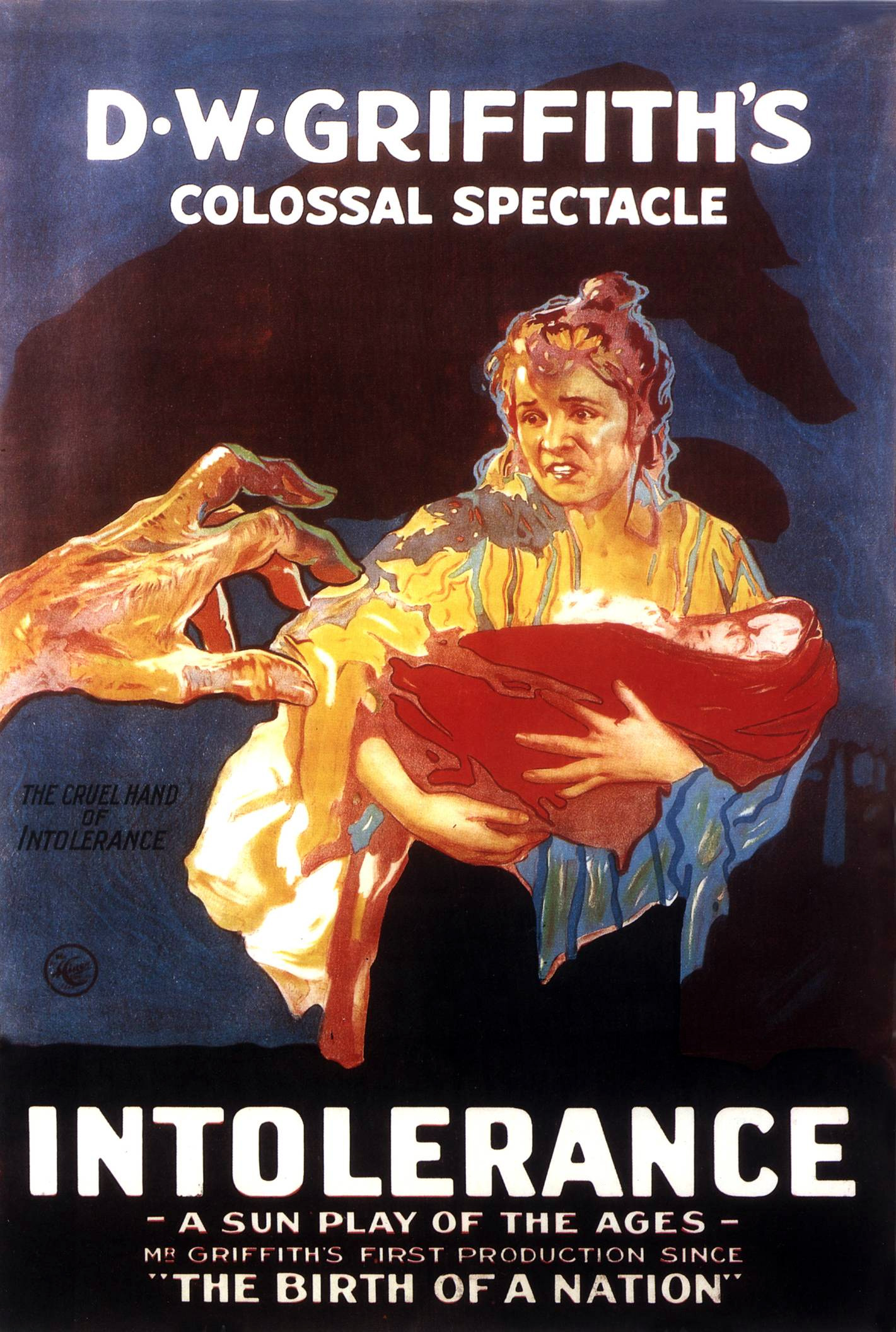
Poster for Griffith's Intolerance (1916)

"...the American cinema constantly shoots and reshoots a single fundamental film, which is the birth of a nation-civilisation, whose first version was provided by Griffith."

Deleuze defines two forms of the action-image: the large form and the small form. In realism, which "produced the universal triumph of American cinema", actions transform an initial situation. Large form is defined as SAS. There are gaps waiting to be filled. The main genres of this image are the documentary film, the psycho-social film, film noir, the Western and the historical film. Deleuze attributes the large form to the Actors Studio and its method. Small form is defined as ASA. The actions create the situation. The films of Chaplin, Buster Keaton and Harold Lloyd play with the spectator's assumptions of what they are viewing on the screen. The SAS and ASA can be a continuous progression occurring many times throughout the film.

=== Mental images ===
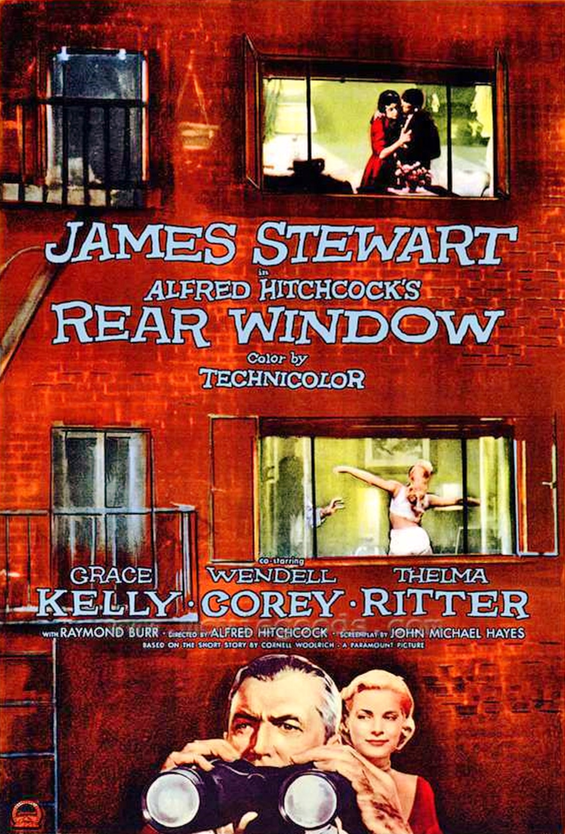
Poster for Hitchcock's Rear Window (1954)

"We hardly believe any longer that a global situation can give rise to an action which is capable of modifying it – no more than we believe that an action can force a situation to disclose itself, even partially".

Hitchcock, according to Deleuze, introduces the mental image, where relation itself is the object of the image. And this takes movement-image to its crisis. After Hitchcock, both the small form and the large form are in crisis, as are action-images in general. In Robert Altman's Nashville the multiple characters and storylines refer to a dispersive, rather than a globalising situation. In Sidney Lumet's Serpico and Dog Day Afternoon characters "behave like windscreen wipers". Deleuze develops this theory by detailing the chronology of Italian neorealism, French New Wave, and New German Cinema. Deleuze states that we must think "beyond movement", which leads us to Cinema 2: The Time-Image.

== Taxonomy of movement-images ==
Deleuze's use of the semiotics of Charles Sanders Peirce allows him to expand the taxonomy of movement-images beyond the principle Bergsonian co-ordinates of perception-images, affection-images, action-images, and mental-images. Deleuze writes: "there is every reason to believe that many other kinds of images can exist". This whole world of filmic images is what Felicity Colman calls Deleuze's "ciné-system" or "ciné-semiotic".

=== Peirce's semiotics ===
Deleuze sees a correspondence between Bergson's types of images and Peirce's semiotics. For Peirce, the basis of his semiotics is three categories of signs: firstness, or feeling; secondness, or reaction; and thirdness, or representation. Bergson's affect corresponds to firstness/feeling; action corresponds to secondness/reaction; and habitual memory corresponds to thirdness/representation. Deleuze also must account for Bergson's perception in Peircean terms, writing "there will be a 'zeroness' before Peirce's firstness". This is because Peirce

"claims the three types of image as a fact, instead of deducing them […] the affection-image, the action-image and the relation-image […] are deduced from the movement-image […] this deduction is possible only if we first assume a perception-image. Of course, perception is strictly identical to every image […] And perception will not constitute a first type of image in the movement-image without being extended into the other types […]: perception of action, of affection, of relation […] The perception-image will therefore be like a degree zero in the deduction which is carried out as a function of the movement-image".

Deleuze can thus align Bergson and Peirce, as well as his own ciné-system:

Bergson	Deleuze	Peirce
perception	perception-image	zeroness
affect	affection-image	firstness/feeling
action	action-image	secondness/reaction
habitual memory	mental-image / relation-image / memory-image, etc.	thirdness/representation

Furthermore, for Peirce, every sign has three aspects: it is a sign in and for itself; it is a sign in relation to the object from which it arises; and it must be encountered and interpreted by a mind. This means that each of the categories of firstness, secondness, and thirdness have three aspects. So, there are would appear to be 3 x 3 types of sign; or 27 types of sign. However, many of these cancel each other out, and so there will be ten types of sign in total. Deleuze uses Peirce's ten types of sign to expand Bergson's images, also taking into account perception / the perception-image, which he has said Peirce did not account for. Deleuze has in this way allowed for many more images and signs in his ciné-system.

=== How many images and signs? ===
There has been much confusion between Deleuzian cinema scholars over how many images and signs there are in the movement-image, as well as disagreements as to how important such an expansion is for Deleuze's film philosophy. Ronald Bogue, writing in 2003, comments that at "a minimum, the signs of the movement-image are fourteen […]. At most, they number twenty-three […]. But obviously, the tally is insignificant, for Deleuze is no ordinary system builder […] his taxonomy is a generative device meant to create new terms for talking about new ways of seeing". More recently film theorists have begun to take the expansion of the taxonomy as being essential to the Cinema books by citing Deleuze's own evaluations. In cinema Deleuze saw "the proliferation of all kinds of strange signs". Thus the "classification scheme is like the skeleton of a book: it's like a vocabulary […] a necessary first step" before analysis can proceed. David Deamer, writing in 2016, argues that seeing "the full set of images and signs as a relational framework" is therefore "essential". Deamer coins the term "cineosis" (like Colman's ciné-system / ciné-semiotic) to describe this "cinematic semiosis", designating thirty-three signs for the movement-image.

=== Cineosis ===
Deleuze writes on the multitude of movement-images that "[a] film is never made up of a single kind of image […] Nevertheless a film, at least in its most simple characteristics, always has one type of image which is dominant […] a point of view on the whole of the film […] itself a 'reading' of the whole film". Deamer expands upon Deleuze's statement, writing:

"Every [movement-image] film is an assemblage of every genetic sign and all the compositional signs of the [movement-image] cineosis. A character or characters will emerge from out of gaseous perception, creating a centre or centres through liquid perception towards a solid perception of a subject. These characters will gather up the amorphous intensities […] of the any-space-whatever, entering into dividual relations with the mass and becoming an icon which expresses affects through the face. Such affects will pass into action: as impulses and symptoms of the world of primal forces; as behaviours which both reveal the world and attempt to resolve the world […] Such characters and such situations can be reflected upon and so be transformed through cinematic figures equivalent to metaphors, metonyms, inversions, problems and questions. And these films will […] allow characters their dreams and imaginations, their memories, and allow them to understand and comprehend the world through mental relations […] Yet [… a] sign will arise, making an image, avatar and domain dominant. All other images will circulate and dissipate around this sign. We will – in this way – be able to discover how a sign becomes the principle of the film, and so be able to say this film accords with such a sign".

Domain ^{[a]}	Avatar	Image	Signs I. compositional II. intermediary III. genetic	Definition	Ref C1 ^{[b]} [C2] {DD}	Film Examples (DD) ^{[c]}
Perception image Zeroness	Percepts	Perception-image	I. Solid perception	The perception of and by the film-world of a central character.	76	Le scaphandre et le papillon
Perception image Zeroness	Percepts	Perception-image	II. Liquid perception	Perceptions and the perceived proliferate, an ensemble film.	76	Timecode
Perception image Zeroness	Percepts	Perception-image	III. Gaseous perception	Non-human perception. Acentred images. Abstract experimentalism.	60	Naqoyqatsi
Affection image Firstness	Affects	Affection-image	I. Icon	A film overwhelmed by close-ups of faces. The expression of emotions.	88	Theeviravaathi
Affection image Firstness	Affects	Affection-image	II. Dividual	Emotions expressed through the mass, the crowd, a group.	92	Despicable Me movies
Affection image Firstness	Affects	Affection-image	III. Any-space-whatever	Indeterminate affects: landscapes, cityscapes, pure backgrounds.	111	Le quattro volte
Action image Secondness	Actions	Impulse-image	I. Symptom	Impulses that overwhelm a character.	137	The Human Centipede
Action image Secondness	Actions	Impulse-image	II. Fetish	An object that captures up primal forces: a cross, rabbits foot, etc.	128	Harry Potter and the Deathly Hallows
Action image Secondness	Actions	Impulse-image	III. Originary world	Backgrounds and sets permeated by primal forces.	123	Innocence
Action image Secondness	Actions	Action-image (small); ASA action → situation	I. Lack	A situation is revealed through the actions of the characters.	160	Mother
Action image Secondness	Actions	Action-image (small); ASA action → situation	II. Equivocity	Character actions reveal perspectives of the situation.	161	The Killer Inside Me
Action image Secondness	Actions	Action-image (small); ASA action → situation	III. Vector	The paradoxical complexities of a film-world are revealed.	168	Ajami
Action image Secondness	Actions	Action-image (large); SAS / SAS' / SAS" situation → action	I. Milieu	A determined situation defines the actions of characters within it.	141	Marxism Today (Prologue)
Action image Secondness	Actions	Action-image (large); SAS / SAS' / SAS" situation → action	II. Binomial	Tends toward pure action through duels between characters.	151	Made in Dagenham
Action image Secondness	Actions	Action-image (large); SAS / SAS' / SAS" situation → action	III. Imprint	Actions of characters are the result of internal factors determined by world.	157	Fish Tank
Mental image Thirdness	Figures reflection-images, or, transformation of forms	Attraction-image; 1st reflection-image 6th mental-image	I. Plastic figure	The revealed situation is metaphor for the real situation.	182	The Wayward Cloud
Mental image Thirdness	Figures reflection-images, or, transformation of forms	Attraction-image; 1st reflection-image 6th mental-image	II. Theatrical figure	Cinematic allegories.	183	Scott Pilgrim vs. the World
Mental image Thirdness	Figures reflection-images, or, transformation of forms	Attraction-image; 1st reflection-image 6th mental-image	III. Mise-en-abyme ^{[d]}	A complex recurrence and mirroring of tropes.	{108}	Source Code
Mental image Thirdness	Figures reflection-images, or, transformation of forms	Inversion-image; 2nd reflection-image 5th mental-image	I. Sublime figure	The actions of the character overwhelm the givens of the situation, a mad enterprise.	184	Four Lions
Mental image Thirdness	Figures reflection-images, or, transformation of forms	Inversion-image; 2nd reflection-image 5th mental-image	II. Enfeebled figure	Futile actions against the immensity of the universe.	185	Slackistan
Mental image Thirdness	Figures reflection-images, or, transformation of forms	Inversion-image; 2nd reflection-image 5th mental-image	III. Quotidian ^{[e]}	The everyday: both inconsequential and unfathomable at the same time.	{112}	Un homme qui crie
Mental image Thirdness	Figures reflection-images, or, transformation of forms	Discourse-image; 3rd reflection-image 4th mental-image	I. Limit of large form	The situation articulates a question, only once the question and answered can the character act.	190	Monsters
Mental image Thirdness	Figures reflection-images, or, transformation of forms	Discourse-image; 3rd reflection-image 4th mental-image	II. Limit of small form	The film develops a narration where the coordinates of a question will be left unanswered.	194	Brooklyn's Finest
Mental image Thirdness	Figures reflection-images, or, transformation of forms	Discourse-image; 3rd reflection-image 4th mental-image	III. Limit of action ^{[f]}	A whole world of problems, the universe expressing intensive indeterminate forces.	{118}	Metro Manila
Mental image Thirdness	Memory	Dream-image (from Cinema 2) ^{[h]} 3rd mental-image	I. Rich dreams	Framed by a dream sequence: clear when dreamer enters and exits the dream.	[58]	Star Trek: First Contact
Mental image Thirdness	Memory	Dream-image (from Cinema 2) ^{[h]} 3rd mental-image	II. Restrained dreams	Moves between real world and dream world are subtle, even invisible.	[58]	The Machinist
Mental image Thirdness	Memory	Dream-image (from Cinema 2) ^{[h]} 3rd mental-image	III. Movement of world	Dream world = real world / real world = dream world.	[63]	Inception
Mental image Thirdness	Memory	Recollection-image (from Cinema 2) ^{[h]} 2nd mental-image	I. Strong destiny ^{[g]}	Flashbacks directing the destiny of the character.	[49] {128-9}	El secreto de sus ojos
Mental image Thirdness	Memory	Recollection-image (from Cinema 2) ^{[h]} 2nd mental-image	II. Weak destiny ^{[g]}	Flashbacks are ambiguous or incomplete.	[49] {128-9}	White Material
Mental image Thirdness	Memory	Recollection-image (from Cinema 2) ^{[h]} 2nd mental-image	III. Forking paths	Flashbacks within flashbacks; or repetitions of images with difference	[49]	Triangle
Mental image Thirdness	Memory	Relation-image; 1st mental-image	I. Mark	A habitual series of images form the chain of a thought, a thinking process.	198	Se7en
Mental image Thirdness	Memory	Relation-image; 1st mental-image	II. Demark	An established chain of thought is broken open with an aberrant image.	203	Doctor Who: The Day of the Doctor
Mental image Thirdness	Memory	Relation-image; 1st mental-image	III. Symbol	A concrete object or event becomes the symbolic centre of the film.	204	Buried
Notes: a Adapted from David Deamer's "Cartography of the Cineosis".; b Most of the images and signs of the movement-image appear and are named in Cinema 1. However, some signs are not named and some images and signs appear early in Cinema 2. If the reference is without parenthesis this indicates it comes from Cinema 1. If the reference is in [-] this indicates it comes from Cinema 2. If the reference is in {-} this indicates it is not named by Deleuze, and the naming and explicit description (based upon Deleuze) comes from David Deamer's Deleuze's Cinema Books: Three Introductions to the Taxonomy of Images – see 'References' > 'General' and 'Bibliography' > 'Secondary texts' below. Occurrences of [-] and {-} are noted and discussed below.; c Examples comes from David Deamer's Deleuze's Cinema Books: Three Introductions to the Taxonomy of Images – see 'References' > 'General' and 'Bibliography' > 'Secondary texts' below.; d "Deleuze does not name the genetic sign of the attraction-image, nor does he describe how it might operate. However, the logic of this reflection-image would seem to indicate an encounter with a sign which could compose both the plastic and the theatrical figures […] Such a description appears to designate the figure known as mise en abyme: the recurrence of an image within an image within an image. (A consideration of the case of the inversion-image is also helpful here. Deleuze will derive the genetic sign of this reflection-image through just such a collapse and folding […]".; e "While Deleuze does not name the genetic sign of the inversion-image, there is the intimation of a description, in that – under certain conditions – the figure of the sublime and the figure of enfeeblement can become 'the same thing' (C1: 186). Such a description indicates a genetic figure where the two signs of composition circulate each within the other."; f "Deleuze writes: 'the two limits are themselves re-united […]' (C1: 187). [… W]e encounter here – in this reuniting of the limits of the two forms – the sign of the extreme limit of all action-images (large, small, their attractions, their inversions and their own limits). Such a naming must be imposed upon this sign, for Deleuze does not specify the designation; yet the function of this final figure is clear – as with the two reflection-images describing attraction and inversion before it, the compositional signs come together and find their common origin."; g "[F]or Deleuze, such flashbacks will be distributed between the two extreme poles of the recollection-image as either memory as 'an explanation, a causality or a linearity'; or memory as the 'fragmentation of all linearity … [as] breaks in causality' (C2: 49). The former designates a general sign of composition named destiny. While Deleuze does not go on to divide this general sign of composition into its full molar and secondary attributes, a division will here be assumed to describe a difference in degree and – following the example of the dream-image with its rich and restrained forms – similarly adopt strong and weak forms: strong destiny and weak destiny."; h These images, while not appearing in Cinema 1 but in Cinema 2, are definitely movement-images. Deleuze writes: "with recollection-images" and "dream-images" the "former still come within the framework of the sensory-motor situation" and "the latter […] project the sensory-motor situation to infinity"; thus "we do not, in this way, leave behind an indirect representation [of time, movement-images], even though we come close".

=== Beyond the movement-image ===
At the beginning of Cinema 2, and after recapitulating the full movement-image cineosis developed in Cinema 1, Deleuze asks the question: 'why does Peirce think that everything ends with thirdness and the relation-image and that there is nothing beyond?'. It is in response to this question that Deleuze will go on to explore a new image of cinema, or as Colman puts it, "Deleuze expands his ciné-semiotic language to describe the time-image".

== See also ==
- Assemblage (philosophy)
- Auteur theory
- Film genre
- Deterritorialization
- Film semiotics
- Mise en scène
- Plane of immanence

== Bibliography ==
=== Primary texts ===
- Deleuze, Gilles. Cinema 1: The Movement Image. Trans. Hugh Tomlinson and Barbara Habberjam. London & New York: The Athlone Press, 1989.
- Deleuze, Gilles. Cinema 2: The Time Image. Trans. Hugh Tomlinson and Robert Galeta. London & New York: The Athlone Press, 1989.
- Bergson, Henri. Matter and Memory. Trans. N. M. Paul and W. S. Palmer. New York: Zone Books, 2002.
- Peirce, Charles Sanders. "Pragmatism and Pragmaticism" in Collected Papers of Charles Sanders Peirce: Volume V and VI. Eds. C. Hartshorne and P. Weiss, Cambridge, MA: Belknap Press of Harvard University Press, 1974

=== Secondary texts ===
- Bogue, Ronald. Deleuze on Cinema. New York and London: Routledge, 2003.
- Colman, Felicity. Deleuze & Cinema: The Film Concepts. Oxford & New York: Berg, 2011
- Deamer, David. Deleuze's Cinema Books: Three Introductions to the Taxonomy of Images. Edinburgh: Edinburgh University Press, 2016.
- Rodowick, D.N. Gilles Deleuze's Time Machine. Durham, NC: Duke University Press, 1997.

=== Further reading ===
- Buchanan, Ian and Patricia MacCormack, eds. Deleuze and the Schizoanalysis of Cinema. London and New York: Continuum, 2008.
- Deamer, David. Deleuze, Japanese Cinema, and the Atom Bomb: The Spectre of Impossibility. New York: Bloomsbury, 2014.
- Flaxman, Gregory (ed.). The Brain is the Screen: Gilles Deleuze and the Philosophy of Cinema. Minneapolis: University of Minnesota Press, 2000.
- Martin-Jones, David. Deleuze and World Cinemas. London and New York: Continuum, 2011.
- MacCormack, Patricia. Cinesexuality. Aldershot, England and Burlington, VT: Ashgate, 2008.
- Marrati, Paola. Gilles Deleuze: Cinema and Philosophy. Trans. Alisa Hartz. Baltimore, MD: Johns Hopkins University Press, 2008.
- Pisters, Patricia. The Matrix of Visual Culture: Working With Deleuze in Film Theory. Stanford, CA: Stanford University Press, 2003.
- Powell, Anna. Deleuze and Horror Film. Edinburgh: Edinburgh University Press, 2006.
- ---. Deleuze, Altered States, and Film. Edinburgh: Edinburgh University Press, 2007.
- Rodowick, D.N., (ed.). Afterimages of Gilles Deleuze's Film Philosophy. Minneapolis: University of Minnesota Press, 2010.
- Shaviro, Steven. The Cinematic Body. Minneapolis: University of Minnesota Press, 1993.
- Shilina-Conte, Tanya. Black Screens, White Frames: Gilles Deleuze and the Filmmaking Machine. New York and London: Oxford University Press, 2024.
