= Cinema 2: The Time-Image =

1985 book by Gilles Deleuze

Cinema 2: The Time Image
- Cover of the French edition
- Author: Gilles Deleuze
- Original title: Cinéma 2, L'image-temps
- Translator: Hugh Tomlinson; Robert Galeta
- Language: French
- Subjects: Philosophy; Film theory
- Published: 1985 (Les Éditions de Minuit)
- Publication place: France
- Media type: Print
- Pages: 379
- ISBN: 978-2-7073-1047-7
- Preceded by: Cinéma 1. L'image-mouvement (1983)
- Followed by: Foucault (1986)

Cinema 2: The Time-Image (French: Cinéma 2, L'image-temps) (1985) is the second volume of Gilles Deleuze's work on cinema, the first being Cinema 1: The Movement-Image (French: Cinéma 1. L'image-mouvement) (1983). Cinema 1 and Cinema 2 have become to be known as the Cinema books, and are complementary and interdependent texts.

Using the philosophy of Henri Bergson, Deleuze offers an analysis of the cinematic treatment of time and memory, thought and speech. The book draws on the work of major filmmakers like Fellini, Antonioni and Welles.

== Content ==
The first three chapters of Cinema 2, each outlining a number of ways of approaching what Deleuze calls "the time-image". The first chapter explores the works of various filmmakers who were, according to Deleuze, precursors to time-images. The second chapter takes a "taxonomical" approach, showing how the time-image goes beyond what the author has defined as "movement-image" in Cinéma 1. The third chapter introduces two more types of movement-images in order to better differentiate time-images.

=== Beyond the movement-image ===
In the first chapter of Cinema 2, Deleuze picks up where he left off in Cinema 1 to discuss how the time-image is born from a crisis of the movement-image. Thus, instead of what Deleuze had described as perception-images, affection-images, action-images, and mental images (all types of movement-image), there are now "opsigns" and "sonsigns" which resist movement-image differentiation. As David Rodowick writes: 'In the absence of a predetermined trajectory' the image becomes 'what Deleuze calls opsigns and sonsigns, or pure optical and acoustical images.' Deleuze explores opsigns and sonsigns through the cinema of the Italian neorealists and Japanese director Yasujirō Ozu.

=== From movement-image to time-image ===
Deleuze then goes on to give a partial overview of Cinema 1 from the perspective of his taxonomical project, before once again deriving opsigns and sonsigns.

=== Limit of movement-images ===
In the third chapter of the book, Deleuze discusses recollection-images (flashbacks) and dream-images. These images seem – says Deleuze – to be time-images, however, they remain movement-images. Nonetheless, they point the way toward time-images.

== Analysis ==
=== Types of time-image ===
The second part of Cinema 2 concerns Deleuze's classification of types of time-image, which he will summarize in the second section of chapter 10, the final chapter of the book, and the conclusion to both Cinema books:

- opsigns and sonsigns
- hyalosigns (or crystal-images)
- chronosigns
- noosigns
- lectosigns

In Cinema 1, Deleuze's use of the semiotics of Charles Sanders Peirce allowed him to expand the taxonomy of movement-images. However, in Cinema 2 Deleuze does not provide any rationale for his taxonomy and there has been some debate as how the author justifies his categorisation.

According to Rodowick, 'time-images emerge from what Deleuze calls, in Difference and Repetition, the three passive syntheses of time'. A number of other theorists have gone on to suggest very different relations between Deleuze's full taxonomy of cinema and Difference and Repetition. However, in 2011 David Deamer published an essay titled 'A Deleuzian Cineosis: Cinematic Semiosis and Syntheses of Time' in what was then called Deleuze Studies, which returned to Rodowick's brief comment and explored the claim in depth, writing 'the impetus for the taxonomy of the time-image lies in the account given of the three passive syntheses of time in Difference and Repetition,' and 'the nine aspects of the passive syntheses can be seen to correspond to the nine proper signs of the time-image'. Deamer went on to develop this relation between Cinema 2 and Difference and Repetition in Deleuze's Cinema Books: Three Introductions to the Taxonomy of Images (2016). Therein he sees a much wider connection, and goes on to show how it goes beyond the concerns of just the temporal syntheses, writing on the 'three constitutive syntheses of time, space, and consciousness' and that 'it is these three constitutive syntheses that can be seen to inspire the structure of the time-image taxonomy.'

=== "Cineosis" ===
Deamer coins the term "cineosis" to describe Deleuze's "cinematic semiosis", designating the images and the images with signs.

Image^{[a]}	Sign	Film Examples (DD)^{[b]}
Opsigns and sonsigns		Five
Hyalosigns	mirrors face-to-face	Black Swan
Hyalosigns	limpid and opaque	Self Made
Hyalosigns	seed and environment	Synecdoche, New York
Chronosigns	sheets of the past	Russian Ark
Chronosigns	peaks of the present	Uncle Boonmee Who Can Recall His Past Lives
Chronosigns	powers of the false	24 City
Noosigns	body of attitude	I'm Not There
Noosigns	body of gest	Police, Adjective
Noosigns	cinema of the brain	Dogville
Lectosigns		Enter the Void
Notes: a Adapted from David Deamer's "Cartography of the Cineosis".; b Examples comes from David Deamer's Deleuze's Cinema Books: Three Introductions to the Taxonomy of Images - see 'References' > 'General' and 'Bibliography' > 'Secondary texts' below.

== Bibliography ==
=== Primary texts ===
- Deleuze, Gilles. Cinema 1: The Movement Image. Trans. Hugh Tomlinson and Barbara Habberjam. London & New York: The Athlone Press, 1989.
- Deleuze, Gilles. Cinema 2: The Time Image. Trans. Hugh Tomlinson and Robert Galeta. London & New York: The Athlone Press, 1989.
- Bergson, Henri. Matter and Memory. Trans. N. M. Paul and W. S. Palmer. New York: Zone Books, 2002.
- Peirce, Charles Sanders. "Pragmatism and Pragmaticism" in Collected Papers of Charles Sanders Peirce: Volume V and VI. Eds. C. Hartshorne and P. Weiss, Cambridge, MA: Belknap Press of Harvard University Press, 1974

=== Secondary texts ===
- Bogue, Ronald. Deleuze on Cinema. New York and London: Routledge, 2003.
- Colman, Felicity. Deleuze & Cinema: The Film Concepts. Oxford & New York: Berg, 2011
- Deamer, David. Deleuze's Cinema Books: Three Introductions to the Taxonomy of Images. Edinburgh: Edinburgh University Press, 2016.
- Rodowick, D.N. Gilles Deleuze's Time Machine. Durham, NC: Duke University Press, 1997.

=== Further reading ===
- Buchanan, Ian and Patricia MacCormack, eds. Deleuze and the Schizoanalysis of Cinema. London and New York: Continuum, 2008.
- Deamer, David. Deleuze, Japanese Cinema, and the Atom Bomb: The Spectre of Impossibility. New York: Bloomsbury, 2014.
- Flaxman, Gregory (ed.). The Brain is the Screen: Gilles Deleuze and the Philosophy of Cinema. Minneapolis: University of Minnesota Press, 2000.
- Martin-Jones, David. Deleuze and World Cinemas. London and New York: Continuum, 2011.
- MacCormack, Patricia. Cinesexuality. Aldershot, England and Burlington, VT: Ashgate, 2008.
- Marrati, Paola. Gilles Deleuze: Cinema and Philosophy. Trans. Alisa Hartz. Baltimore, MD: Johns Hopkins University Press, 2008.
- Pisters, Patricia. The Matrix of Visual Culture: Working With Deleuze in Film Theory. Stanford, CA: Stanford University Press, 2003.
- Powell, Anna. Deleuze and Horror Film. Edinburgh: Edinburgh University Press, 2006.
- ---. Deleuze, Altered States, and Film. Edinburgh: Edinburgh University Press, 2007.
- Rodowick, D.N., (ed.). Afterimages of Gilles Deleuze's Film Philosophy. Minneapolis: University of Minnesota Press, 2010.
- Shaviro, Steven. The Cinematic Body. Minneapolis: University of Minnesota Press, 1993.
- Shilina-Conte, Tanya. Black Screens, White Frames: Gilles Deleuze and the Filmmaking Machine. New York and London: Oxford University Press, 2024.
- Skoller, Jeffrey. Shadows, Specters, Shards: Making History in Avant-Garde Film. University of Minnesota press, 2005.
