= Korukonda =

Korukonda may refer to:

- Korukonda (Vizianagaram district), a city in Korukonda Mandal, Andhra Pradesh, India
- Korukonda Mandal, one of 64 mandals in East Godavari district, Andhra Pradesh, India
