= Sainik School, Korukonda =

Coordinates: 18°03′00″N 83°20′15″E

Sainik School Korukonda
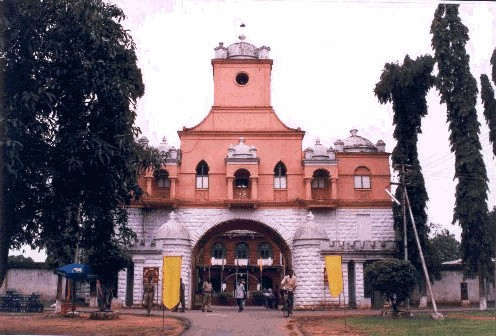
- Main gate of Sainik School, Korukonda
- Korukonda, Andhra Pradesh; India

Information
- Type: Public school Run by the Ministry of Defence
- Motto: Ever Loyal
- Established: 18 January 1962
- Founder: Cdr. Trevor De Almeda (first principal)
- President: VAdm. A. K. Chopra
- Principal: Gp. Cpt. S. Shastri
- Grades: Class VI-XII
- Gender: Mixed-gender
- Age: 10 to 18
- Enrollment: 525
- Campus size: 206-acre (0.83 km^{2})
- Campus type: Fully residential
- Colours: Grey and Maroon
- Affiliation: CBSE
- Former pupils: Saikorian Alumni Association Official Website
- Houses: Maurya, Kakatiya, Pallava, Pandya, Moghul, Chalukya, Gupta, Gajapathi (boys); Satavahana (girls)
- Website: Official website

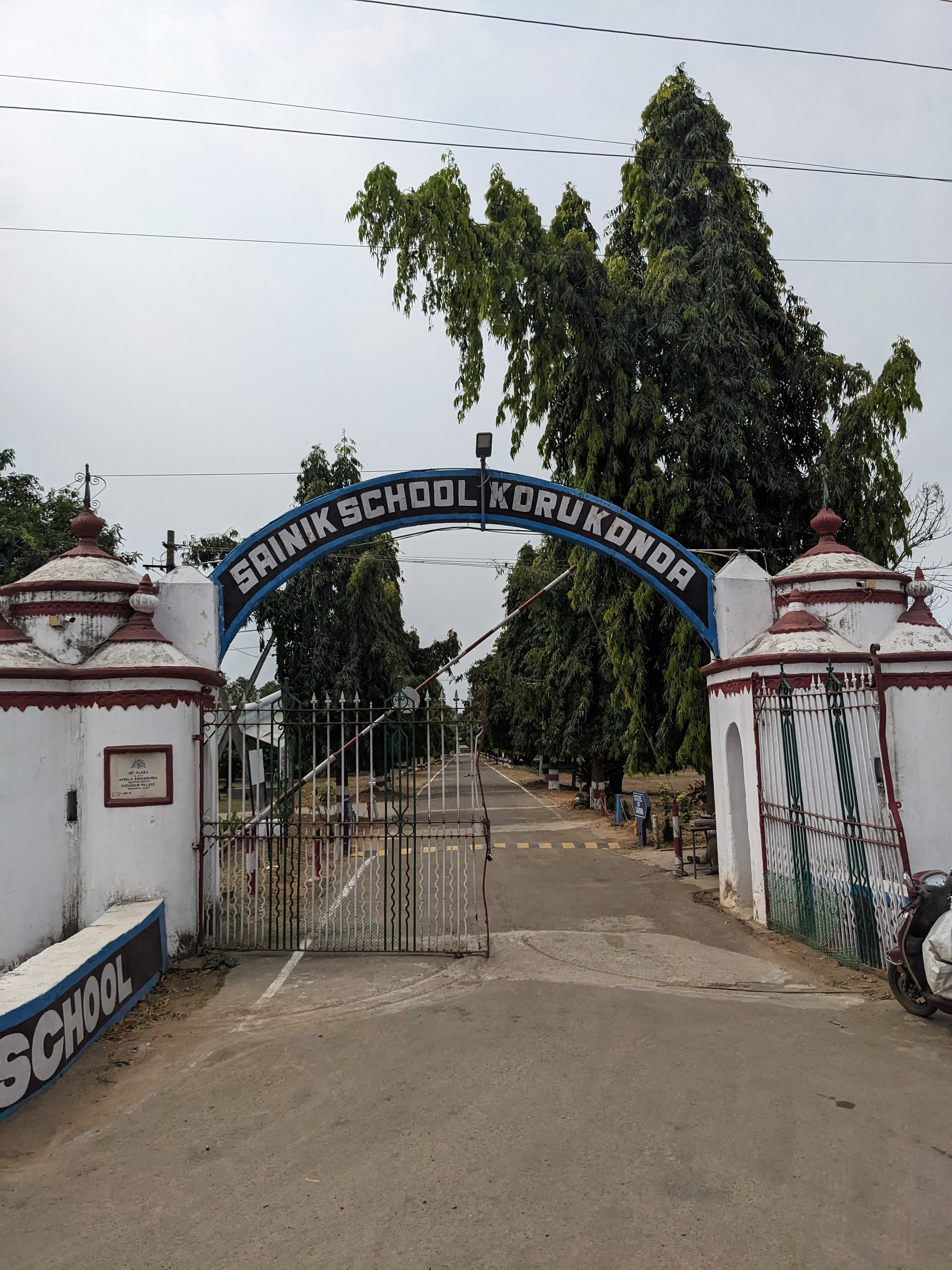
Sainik School Korukonda main gate

Sainik School at Korukonda is an Indian secondary school that was informally founded on 10 September 1961. The school was formally founded by its first principal, Commander Trevor De Almeida, on 18 January 1962, when the first batch of 205 students joined. Initially an all-boys school, the Sainik School started admitting girl students for the first time in 2021 by allocating 10 out of 80 admissions in class 6 to girls. Admission to the school is extremely competitive; it received 11,000 applications for the 80 open seats in 2021.

== Overview ==
The building which is now Sainik School was originally named Alak Appala Kondayamba Vijayaram Palace. It was built in 1911 by Maharaja Vijayaram Gajapathi Raju as his country residence, and later bequeathed to his second son Dr. Vijayanand Gajapathi Raju, Padmabushan, (P.V.G. Raju) LLD, a Member of Parliament and a great cricket lover, known as "Vizzy" in cricketing circles, who gifted the palace, along with 206 acres (0.83 km^{2}) of land surrounding it, for use as a school in September 1961. As a tribute to the Royal Family, the original crest and motto of the Gajapathi dynasty was adopted by the school from its inception.

The Palace was a center for games and sports, where all-India tournaments were conducted, and sportsmen from all over India came to participate and enjoy the princely reception until about 1933.

The school now sends around 600 students into the National Defence Academy. The instructional block is a two-storied building with classrooms, laboratories, an arts and crafts gallery, and academic departments. The administrative wing of the school is housed in the Palace. The school has an auditorium with a capacity of 650, a swimming pool, eight dormitories for the cadets, a cadets' mess (Almeida Hall - named after the first principal), a library, a sports ground of around 50 acres (200,000 m^{2}), a tennis court, a squash court and two children's parks. The swimming pool was constructed in the memory of alumnus Malli Mastan Babu.

== Notable alumni ==
- Col. B. Santosh Babu, MVC, Commanding Officer of 16 Bihar Regiment
- Duvvuri Subbarao, former governor, Reserve Bank of India
- Cmde. C. Uday Bhaskar, Indian Navy, Defence Analyst
- K. Vijaya Bhaskar - Telugu film director
- Siddhartha Nuni - Film cinematographer
- Cherukuri Rajkumar alias Azad, Spokesperson, Communist Party of India (Maoist)
- Malli Mastan Babu, mountaineer and a world's fastest summiteer
- VAdm. Murlidhar Sadashiv Pawar, retired Deputy Chief of Naval Staff
