= The Untitled Kartik Krishnan Project =

- Directed by: Srinivas Sunderrajan
- Written by: Srinivas Sunderrajan, Vijesh Rajan
- Starring: Kartik Krishnan; Vishwesh K; Swara Bhaskar; D Santosh
- Cinematography: Hashim Badani
- Edited by: Srinivas Sunderrajan
- Music by: Sujil Sukumaran
- Production company: Enter Guerrilla Productions
- Release date: 26 October 2010
- Running time: 75 minutes
- Country: India
- Language: Hindi
- Budget: ₹ 40,000 (1000 USD$)

The Untitled Kartik Krishnan Project is a 2010 Indian film produced and directed by independent filmmaker Srinivas Sunderrajan. It is a Hindi-English drama-thriller film with English subtitles shot on HDV in black-and-white. It is touted as India's first Mumble Core film. The film was shot entirely on location in Mumbai, India. It was screened at the 2010 Mumbai International Film Festival in the New Faces of Indian Cinema Section on 26 October 2010 and on 5 June 2011 at Transylvania International Film Festival in competition.

== Synopsis ==
In a bustling office in Mumbai, Kartik Krishnan (Kartik Krishnan) sits behind his desk coding HTML websites when he chances upon a blog on cinema featuring Independent filmmakers. This sparks his intentions to make his own short film, thus leading him to contact Srinivas Sunderrajan (played by Vishwesh K), an independent filmmaker who had met Kartik's idol and famed director Quentin Tarantino at an international film festival, who in turn agrees to guide Kartik through the process.

As Kartik begins piecing the story, cast and screenplay together, several inexplicable phenomena start emerging in his life including a sinister stalker (D Santosh) dressed in official government clothing; and the sudden appearance of a strange future-telling antique toy.

Kartik finds it hard to make sense of the things going on around him. He also has feelings, for his colleague, Swara Bhaskar(Swara Bhaskar). He can't figure them out. His attempt to find answers takes him on a path that makes him question everything he knows about love, life and logic.

== Cast ==
- Kartik Krishnan as Kartik Krishnan
- Vishwesh K as Srinivas Sunderrajan
- Swara Bhaskar as Swara Bhaskar & 'Maya'
- D Santosh as 'System'

== Production ==
The film was shot on weekends over nearly a year since most of the actors had day jobs and they could only afford to spare the weekend. Also, since there were no location permits, the cast and crew used to sometimes end up without a location for a week, which meant the shoot had to be shifted to the next week. Since the cast were all good friends of Sunderrajan, they agreed to work for free. A lot of the 'time stretch' happened because of location unavailability. And when the location was ready, the actors would be unavailable due to other commitments. True to guerrilla filmmaking, many times the extras and the crowd in the frames did not even know that shooting was being done.

At any given point of time, only the director, the cinematographer and the lead actor, and depending on which location was being filmed - the secondary character was present on the sets. Midway through shooting the original script, the main location (the protagonist's house) collapsed. One day the building was there, and the next day the third floor caved in on the second. And so the location was cordoned off, even though 60 percent of shooting was still left to be done at that location.

The script was outlined, yet completely improvised by the actors with the director often giving the actors a free hand. In keeping with its meta fiction genre, the film's characters were named after the actors who played them and many instances in the film have been based on real events which transpired between the cast and crew.

The initial edit was done on a borrowed Macbook (in-between shooting days) and later the post production, VFX & Sound Design (Vijesh Rajan) of the film was done in a one-month time-span on a home computer so that it could be sent out within several film festivals' deadlines. After seeing an initial screening, director Anurag Kashyap helped to promote the film.

== Festivals ==
- In Competition, Berlin Asian Hot Shots Film Festival 2010
- New Faces, Mumbai International Film Festival 2010
- Dramatic Competition, South Asian International Film Festival, New York 2010
- In Competition, Transylvania International Film Festival, Cluj-Napoca, Romania 2011
