= Sabki Bajegi Band =

- First Look Poster
- Directed by: Anirudh Chawla
- Written by: Anirudh Chawla
- Produced by: Yusuf Shaikh
- Cinematography: Viraj Singh
- Edited by: Sandeep Francis
- Production companies: Percept Pictures; Yen Movies
- Release date: 1 May 2015
- Running time: 108 minutes
- Country: India
- Language: Hindi

Sabki Bajegi Band (transl. Everyone will be exposed) is the first Indian reality film written and directed by Anirudh Chawla and produced by Yusuf Shaikh. The film is presented by Percept Pictures and Yen Movies.

== Cast ==
- Sumeet Vyas as Amit
- Swara Bhaskar as Jaya
- Alekh Sangal as Harsh
- Shaurya Chauhan as Savvy
- Amol Parashar as Siddharth "Sid"
- Aman Uppal as Karan
- Jhanvi Desai as Pallavi
- Samarth Shandilya as DK
- Nisha Lalwani as Vasna
- Rajkummar Rao as Randeep "Randy"

== Production ==
Anirudh Chawla hosted a farmhouse party for his friends who are well known names in the party circuit, television and film industry. There were hidden cameras at the venue. Conversations and confessions got recorded. When Anirudh Chawla and Yusuf Shaikh saw the raw uncensored footage, they decided to turn it in to a reality film.

== Critical reception ==
Times of India gave it 1 out of 5 and said it would be an understatement to say dialogues are 'poor'. Each character displays passion for spouting ridiculous mindless statements that make you cringe.
