= Fahad Ahmad =

Indian political activist

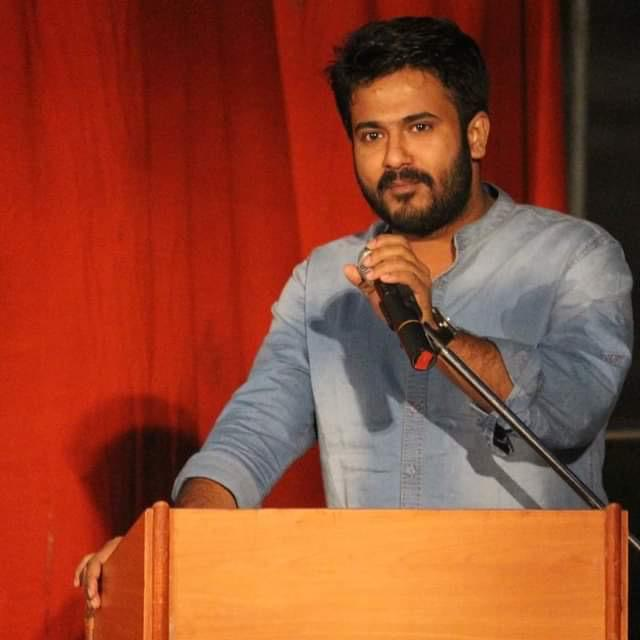
- Fahad Ahmad at Tedx
- Born: February 2, 1989 (age 37); Baheri, Bareilly, Uttar Pradesh, India
- Education: Aligarh Muslim University; Central University of Himachal Pradesh; Tata Institute of Social Sciences
- Occupations: Campaign strategist and researcher
- Years active: 2018–present
- Political party: Nationalist Congress Party (Sharadchandra Pawar) (2024–present); Samajwadi Party (until 2024)
- Movement: CAA and NRC protests
- Spouse: Swara Bhaskar (m. 2023)
- Children: 1

Fahad Ahmad is an Indian student activist and politician who is member of the NCP(SP). He was previously a Member of Samajwadi Party and had served as President of Samajwadi Yuvjan Sabha in Maharashtra.

== Early life and education ==
Fahad Ahmad was born in Baheri.

== Career ==
During his tenure as the general secretary of the TISS Student Union in 2017–2018, Ahmad led a protest against the rolling back of the fee waiver for Scheduled Castes, Scheduled Tribes, and other backward class students, accompanied by over 1000 students. Prakash Ambedkar also supported students in this matter.

Ahmad participated in Anti-CAA protests in Mumbai and attended several rallies across India. He was a part of the Wankhede silent protest during India vs. Australia ODI series. He stated against Citizenship Amendment Act, calling it unconstitutional. In December 2019, he led the August Kranti Maidan protest.

During the covid-19 pandemic, Ahmad distributed food kits in various Mumbai slums along with other student volunteers.

In July 2022, he joined Samajwadi Party in the presence of Abu Azmi and Rais Shaikh. He served as the Maharashtra state President of Samajwadi Yuvjan Sabha, the youth wing of the party.

In October 2024, he quit Samajwadi Party and joined the Nationalist Congress Party – Sharadchandra Pawar and was fielded as the party's candidate for 2024 Maharashtra Legislative Assembly election from Anushakti Nagar constituency.

== Controversies ==
Tata Institute of Social Sciences denied students for clearance after Ahmad refused to accept an MPhil degree from the chairperson of the university S. Ramadorai during the convocation ceremony.

Tata Institute of Social Sciences denied Ahmad registration into the Ph.D. program after he refused to receive his M.Phil. Degree. Tata Institute then gave an order that described Ahmad's action as an insult to the university.

== Personal life ==
On 16 February 2023, Ahmad married Bollywood actress Swara Bhasker. On 23 September 2023, Bhasker gave birth to their daughter, Raabiyaa.

== Television ==
Year	Title	Role	Notes
2025	Pati Patni Aur Panga	Contestant	3rd Runner-up
