= Sheer Qorma (film) =

Indian Hindi language LGBTQ film

- Official poster
- Directed by: Faraz Arif Ansari
- Written by: Faraz Arif Ansari
- Produced by: Marijke Desouza
- Starring: Shabana Azmi; Divya Dutta; Swara Bhaskar
- Cinematography: Sidharth Kale
- Edited by: Akshara Prabhakar
- Production companies: Lotus Visual Production; Futterwacken Films; Darya's Mirror
- Release date: 2021
- Country: India
- Language: Urdu

Sheer Qorma (Urdu: شير قرمہ, romanized: shîr qurmâ "milk and dates") a 2021 Indian short film Drama LGBT romance written and directed by Faraz Arif Ansari of Sisak fame and produced by Marijke Desouza. It is produced by Futterwacken Films. Starring Shabana Azmi, Divya Dutta and Swara Bhaskar, the film revolves around a woman and a non-binary person (played by Dutta and Swara Bhaskar) in love with each other. The filming began in the first week of August 2019 in Mumbai.

== Cast ==
- Shabana Azmi as Ammi
- Divya Dutta as Saira
- Swara Bhaskar as Sitara
- Priya Malik as Susan, Ammi's daughter in law

== Accolades ==
The film won Best Short Film Audience Award at the Frameline Film Festival and also qualified for the British Academy Film Awards 2021.
