= Richard Allen (film scholar) =

American film scholar (born 1959)

Richard Allen (middle name William, born 1959) is an Anglo-American film scholar. He is currently Chair Professor of Film and Media Art at the School of Creative Media City University of Hong Kong, and Director for the Center of Applied Computing and Interactive Media, where he runs a series of grant-funded projects in interactive, immersive media in collaboration with Professor Jeffrey Shaw (HKBU) including City in Time. Allen is a Fellow of the Society for the Cognitive Study of the Moving Image.

== Biography ==
Born in South London, Allen attended Ashford Grammar School before reading Philosophy Politics and Economics at St. John's College, Oxford, where he was head of the Oxford University Film Society. He subsequently earned an MA in Film Studies from the University of East Anglia, where he taught for a year, and a PhD in Theater Arts from UCLA. For 27 years, Allen was Professor of Cinema Studies at the Tisch School of the Arts, New York University, where he served as Head of Department for a total of 10 years. He joined City University of Hong Kong (CityUHK) as Dean of the School of Creative Media, a position he held for 8 years (2016–2024).

== Work ==
With his first book, Projecting Illusion, a psychoanalytically informed defence of an illusion theory of representation, Allen established a reputation as a film theorist writing in the broad tradition of analytical philosophy, which was consolidated by the publication of two co-edited volumes in Film Theory and Philosophy, with Murray Smith, and Wittgenstein, Theory and the Arts, with Malcolm Turvey. He subsequently branched out into the study of the poetics and aesthetic of film.

Allen is perhaps most well-known as a Hitchcock scholar. He directed the Hitchcock Centennial Conference at NYU, and he is author of the widely-praised book, Hitchcock's Romantic Irony, and numerous articles on the master of suspense. He is the co-editor of three anthologies on Hitchcock and for many years he co-edited, with Sidney Gottlieb, the journal of record in Hitchcock Studies, The Hitchcock Annual.

Allen has also published extensively on Indian Cinema. Together with Ira Bhaskar (formerly Professor of Cinema Studies at Jawaharlal Nehru University) he wrote Islamicate Cultures of Bombay Cinema which accompanied a film festival they curated in Abu Dhabi and New York. They also co-edited the volume, Bombay Cinema's Islamicate Histories, which was nominated for the Kraszna-Krausz Book Award in 2023. Allen's most recent book is Storytelling in Hindi Cinema: Doubles, Deception, and Discovery, to be published by Bloomsbury.

Allen's current research lies in melodrama, in particular, the relationship between melodrama and affective piety, and he has published several articles on the topic.

== Publications ==
=== Monographs ===
- Storytelling in Hindi Cinema: Doubles, Deception, and Discovery (Bloomsbury Press, forthcoming 2025).
- Art Machines Past and Present (Hong Kong, City University Press, 2020) ISBN 978-962-442-446-1
- Islamicate Cultures of Bombay Cinema, with Ira Bhaskar (New Delhi: Tulika, 2009), ISBN 978-81-89487-53-9
- Hitchcock's Romantic Irony (New York: Columbia University Press, 2007), ISBN 978-0-231-13575-7
- Projecting Illusion: Film Spectatorship and the Impression of Reality (New York: Cambridge University Press, 1995), ISBN 978-0-521-58715-0

=== Edited books ===
- Bombay Cinema's Islamicate Histories, with Ira Bhaskar (Intellect and Orient Blackswan, 2022), ISBN 978-1-78938-397-3
- The Hitchcock Annual Anthology, with Sid Gottlieb (London: Wallflower Press, May 2009), ISBN 978-1-905674-95-4
- Hitchcock, Past and Future: Essays from the Hitchcock Centenary Conference, with Sam Ishii-Gonzalez (London: Routledge, 2004), ISBN 978-0-415-27526-2
- Camera Obscura/Camera Lucida: Essays in Honor of Annette Michelson, co-ed with Malcolm Turvey (Amsterdam: Amsterdam University Press, 2003), ISBN 978-90-485-0506-7
- Wittgenstein, Theory and the Arts, with Malcolm Turvey (London: Routledge, 2001), ISBN 978-0-415-40825-7
- Alfred Hitchcock: Centenary Essays, with Sam Ishii-Gonzalez (London: BFI, 1999), ISBN 978-1-83871-427-7
- Film Theory and Philosophy: Essays in the Analytic Tradition, with Murray Smith (Oxford: The Clarendon Press, 1997), Online ISBN 978-0-19-167356-6, Print ISBN 978-0-19-815921-6

=== Representative articles and book chapters ===
- "Toward a Philosophy of Melodrama," Projections 17:3 (2023): 1-27, Online ISSN 1934-9696, Print ISSN 1934-9688
- "Under Capricorn: Hitchcock, Melodrama and the Christian Imagination," Hitchcock Annual 23 (2019): 107-140, Online ISSN 2689-4149, Print ISSN 1062-5518
- "The Passion of Christ and the Melodramatic Imagination," in Christine Gledhill and Linda Williams eds. Melodrama Unbound (New York: Columbia University Press, 2018), pp. 31-47, ISBN 978-0-231-18066-5
- "Film, Matter, Spirit: Forest of Bliss," in Rebecca Meyers, William Rothman, and Charles Warren eds. Looking with Robert Gardner: Essay on his Films and his Career (New York: SUNY Press, 2016), 229-46, Paperback ISBN 978-1-4384-6050-5, Hardcover ISBN 978-1-4384-6051-2
- "Hitchcock and the Wandering Woman: The influence of Italian Art Cinema on The Birds," Hitchcock Annual 18 (2013): 149-194, ISBN 978-0-231-16367-5
- "The Sound of The Birds," October 146 (2013): 95-118, ISSN 0162-2870
- "To Catch a Jewel Thief: Hitchcock and Indian Modernity," Hitchcock Annual 15 (2006–2007): 215-41, ISBN 1-906660-05-0
- "Daphne du Maurier and Alfred Hitchcock", in A Companion to Literature and Film, edited by Robert Stam and Alessandra Raengo (2004), Chapter 18, Print ISBN 978-0-631-23053-3, Online ISBN 978-0-470-99912-7
- "The Lodger and The Origins of Hitchcock's Aesthetic," Hitchcock Annual 2001-02: 38-78, ISSN 1062-5518
- "Psychoanalytic Film Theory," in Bob Stam and Toby Miller eds. A Companion to Film Theory (Oxford: Blackwell, 1999), 123-45, Online ISBN 978-0-470-99841-0, Print ISBN 978-0-631-20644-6
