= Ira Bhaskar =

Indian academic and cinema scholar

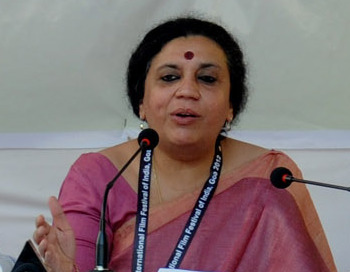
- At the 43rd International Film Festival of India
- Occupations: Professor, cinema studies scholar
- Employer: Jawaharlal Nehru University
- Spouse: C. Uday Bhaskar
- Children: Swara Bhasker

Academic background
- Education: Delhi University; Tisch School of the Arts

Ira Bhaskar is an Indian academic and cinema studies scholar, known for her work on the cultural and historical influences in Indian cinema. She has served as a Professor of Cinema Studies at the School of Arts and Aesthetics, Jawaharlal Nehru University (JNU), New Delhi, and a former dean of the school. Bhaskar has authored and edited influential works, including Islamicate Cultures of Bombay Cinema (2009), and has served on the board of the Nehru Trust for Indian Collections at the Victoria and Albert Museum (NTICVA).

She also served as a member of the Central Board of Film Certification (CBFC).

== Early life and education ==
Ira Bhaskar completed her Bachelor of Arts, Master of Arts, and MPhil in English Literature at Delhi University. She later earned a PhD in Cinema Studies from the Tisch School of the Arts, New York University, in 2005, with a focus on narrative poetics and Indian cinema. Before joining JNU, she taught at Gargi College, Delhi University.

== Academic career ==
Bhaskar served as a Professor of Cinema Studies at JNU’s School of Arts and Aesthetics, also as dean.

Her research explores melodrama, nationalism, and Islamicate cultural influences in Indian cinema, with a particular focus on Bombay cinema. She has published 26 research papers and is recognised for her interdisciplinary approach to film studies.

She has held visiting faculty positions at various institutions, including Columbia University, the University of Pavia, York University, and the Film and Television Institute of India (FTII), Pune. Bhaskar has also been a scholar-in-residence at York University and received research fellowships from the Nehru Memorial Museum and Library and the British Academy.

In 2022, she was appointed to the board of the Nehru Trust for Indian Collections at the Victoria and Albert Museum.

== Central Board of Film Certification ==
Bhaskar served as one of the ten member of the Central Board of Film Certification (CBFC), India’s regulatory body for film certification, where she contributed to the review and certification of films for public exhibition. During her tenure, she engaged with issues of censorship, artistic expression, and cultural representation in Indian films, aligning with her broader scholarly focus on gender and nationalism in cinema. She resigned from the CBFC in January 2015, citing organisational dysfunction, including a lack of board meetings since January 2014 and alleged interference and corruption within the board, following the resignation of CBFC chief Leela Samson amid controversy over the clearance of the film MSG: The Messenger.

== Publications ==
Bhaskar’s scholarship focuses on the historical and cultural dimensions of Indian cinema. Her notable works include:

- Islamicate Cultures of Bombay Cinema (2009, Tulika Books), co-authored with Richard Allen, which examines the influence of Islamic cultural forms on Bollywood cinema.
- Bombay Cinema’s Islamicate Histories (2009, Intellect Books), co-edited with Allen, exploring the historical interplay of Muslim and Hindu cultures in Indian films.
- Facets of India's security: essays for C. Uday Bhaskar (2021, Routledge).
- Contributor to Gender Meets Genre in Postwar Cinemas (2012, University of Illinois Press).

== Personal life ==
Bhaskar is married to C. Uday Bhaskar, a retired Indian Navy officer and strategic analyst. Their daughter, Swara Bhasker, is a Bollywood actress and activist and their son Ishan Bhaskar is a film director.
