= Srinivas Sunderrajan =

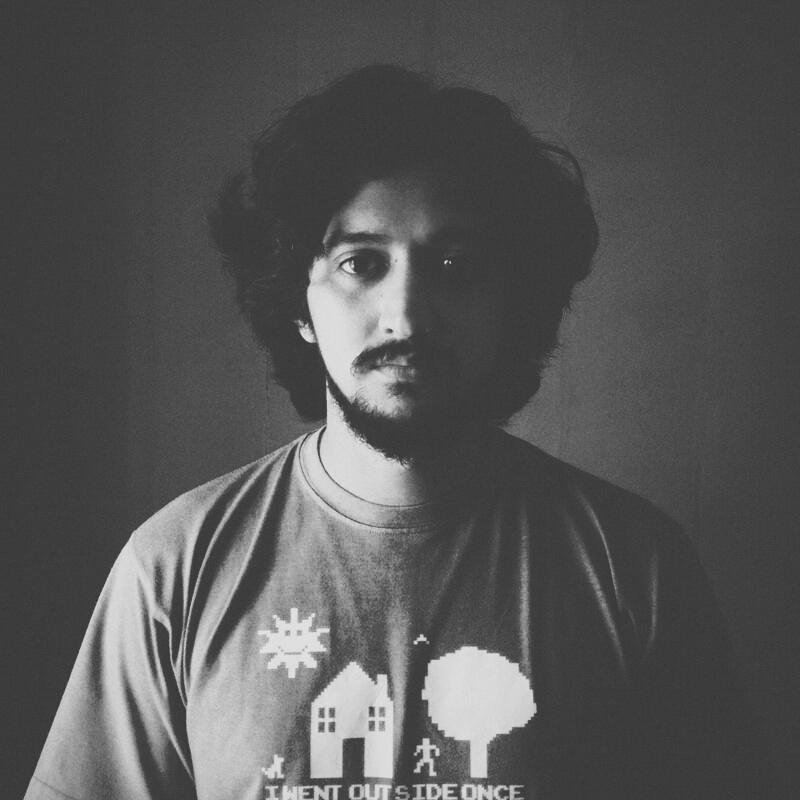
- Occupations: Filmmaker, Director, Writer, Editor, Musician
- Years active: 2006 - Present

Srinivas Sunderrajan or Vaas is an Indian musician and an independent filmmaker based in Mumbai, widely known for his films - The Untitled Kartik Krishnan Project, and Greater Elephant. He is the co-founder of a DIY production house Enter Guerrilla Films, and has directed the third season of The Dewarists. He is currently the bass player for Mumbai’s hardcore band, Scribe.

== Career ==
=== Early years ===
Srinivas assisted on the independent Hindi film - The Pool, directed by Chris Smith and starring Nana Patekar. The film won the Special Jury Prize at Sundance Film Festival. After this experience Srinivas created two short films - Tea Break and Vaapsi. Tea Break won the Grand Jury Prize for Best Short at the Indian Film Festival of Los Angeles, and Vaapsi won the Best Short at the MAMI festival in Mumbai.

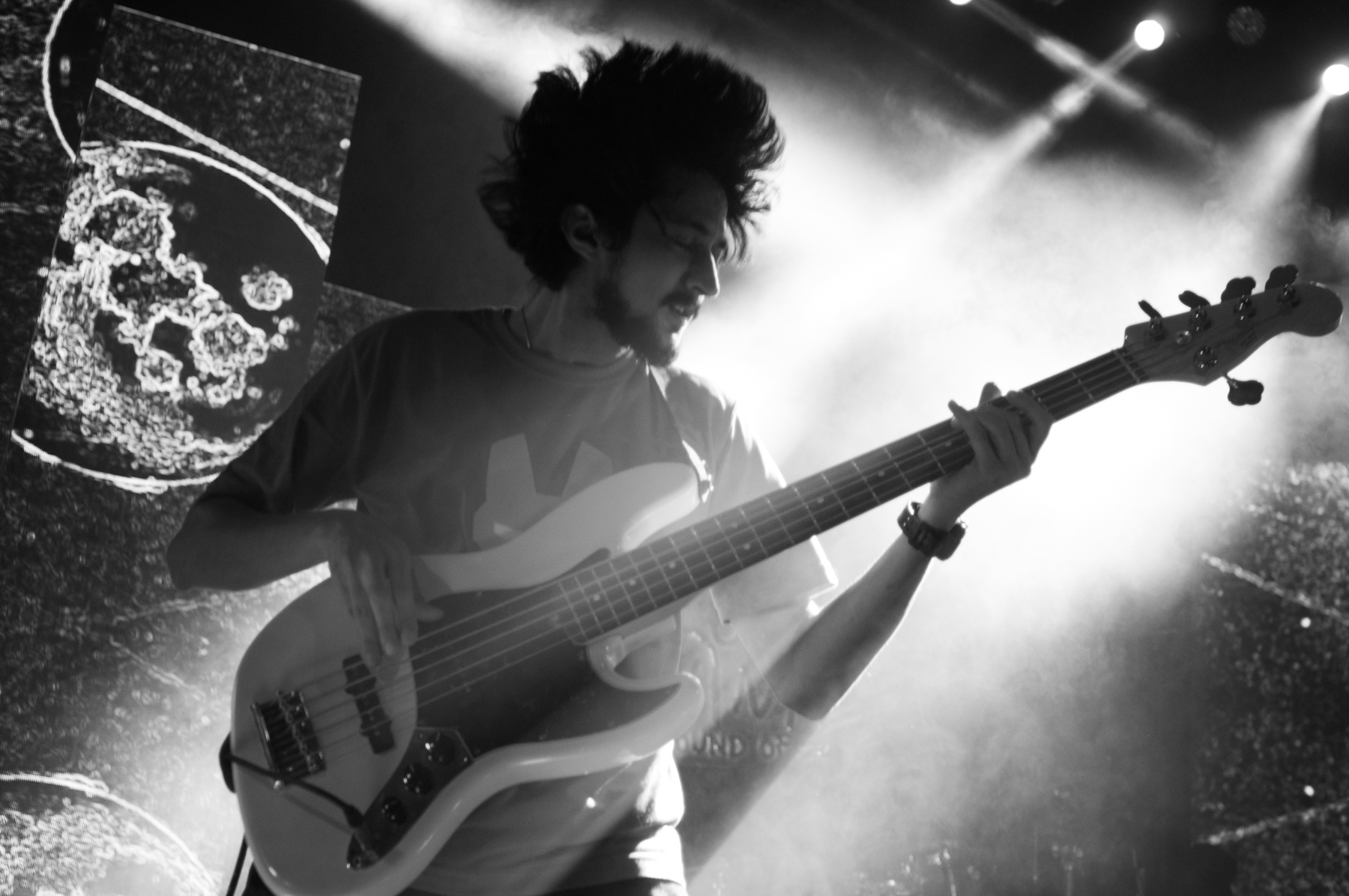
Srinivas performing at a show with his band 'Scribe' at Puma Loves Vinyl show in Bandra, Mumbai, India.

=== The Untitled Kartik Krishnan Project ===
The story is about a software professional who wants to become a filmmaker, his love interest, a corrupt cop and a talking robot. Billed as India’s first Mumble Core film, Srinivas produced and directed The Untitled Kartik Krishnan Project with a budget of only Rs. 40,000 (Roughly less than 1000 USD). The black and white drama-thriller went on to be the first Indian film, to be screened at the Transilvania International Film Festival. After seeing an initial screening Anurag Kashyap helped to promote the film.

=== Greater Elephant ===
Peppered with dark humour, the film follows the mahout who goes on a unique quest to recover his elephant. Srinivas planned Greater Elephant in his college days, long before The Untitled Kartik Krishnan Project took shape. Sunderrajan says that the narrative style in the film has been kept simple as the story is layered with metaphorical meanings. "Since the script takes the story forward, there was no room for visual or camera gimmicks," says Sunderrajan. He chose to crowdfund the distribution of the film saying, “I see crowdfunding as a platform that is 'of the people, by the people and for the people' — where 'people' are the cinema viewers," adding that getting a film to a local cinema is an expensive process and distribution systems in India are archaic.

The film premiered at the South Asian Film Festival in New York City, and won the Jury Prize for the Best Narrative Feature of 2011. In August 2012, Greater Elephant secured a release date in San Francisco where it was screened as a part of the Indian Film Festival of Hope, and in Copenhagen at a festival called CPH PIX.

=== Heartless Ramesh ===
Srinivas has announced his third film titled Heartless Ramesh, that would fall under the genre of mythological fiction. The film would be a fusion of science fiction concepts and Hindu mythological philosophies. “As the synopsis says it’s about a celestial event that signifies the end of time, advent of Kalki and how the government of the future decides to handle it” says Srinivas, “There’s also a love story in it somewhere.” he adds.

== Awards and nominations ==
- Grand Jury Prize for Best Short at the Indian Film Festival of Los Angeles (Tea Break)
- Best Short at the MAMI festival (Vaapsi)
- Jury Prize for the Best Narrative Feature (Greater Elephant)
