= Projections (journal) =

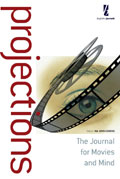
- Discipline: Area studies
- Language: English
- Edited by: Ted Nannicelli

Publication details
- History: 2007–present
- Publisher: Berghahn Books
- Frequency: Biannually

Standard abbreviations
- ISO 4: Projections

Indexing
- ISSN: 1934-9688

Links
- Journal homepage

Projections: The Journal for Movies and Mind is an interdisciplinary peer-reviewed academic journal that explores the way in which the mind experiences, understands, and interprets the audio-semantic and narrative structures of cinema and other visual media. It is published by Berghahn Books in association with The Society for Cognitive Studies of the Moving Image and it is edited by Ted Nannicelli. The journal was the recipient of the 2008 AAP/PSP Prose Award for Best New Journal in Social Sciences and Humanities.

== Editors ==
The following people have been editors of the journal:

- 2009-2018: Stephen Prince
- 2018-present: Ted Nannicelli

== Indexing and abstracting ==
Projections is indexed and abstracted in:

- British Humanities Index
- GEOBASE
- FIAF International Index to Film Periodicals
- International Bibliography of Book Reviews of Scholarly Literature on the Humanities and Social Sciences
- International Bibliography of Periodical Literature
- MLA International Bibliography
