= Korukonda, Vizianagaram district =

Korukonda
- village
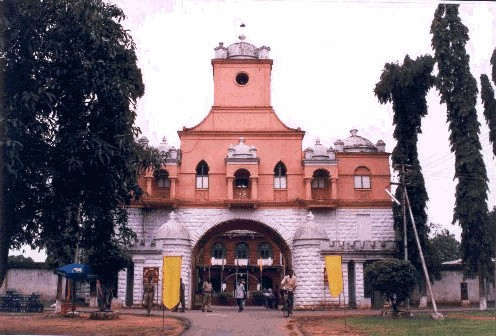
- Main building of Sainik School at Korukonda
- Interactive map of Korukonda
- Coordinates: 18°03′49″N 83°20′05″E
- Country: India
- State: Andhra Pradesh
- District: Vizianagaram district

Population (2001)
  - Total: 5,100

Languages
  - Official: Telugu
- Time zone: UTC+5:30 (IST)

Korukonda is a village and panchayat in the Vizianagaram district in Andhra Pradesh, South India. Korukonda has a small railway station in Waltair division of East Coast Railway, Indian Railways.

== Demographics ==
- Total Population: 5,100 in 1084 Households.
- Male Population: 2,868
- Female Population: 2,232
- Children Under 6-years of age: 515 (Boys - 259 and Girls - 256)
- Total Literates: 2,512
