= David Rodowick =

American philosopher, artist, and curator

David Norman Rodowick (born August 27, 1952) is an American philosopher, artist, and curator. He is best known for his contributions to cinema and media studies, visual cultural studies, critical theory, and aesthetics and the philosophy of art. He became a French citizen in 2002 though retains dual citizenship with the United States.

== Background and education ==
Rodowick was born in Youngstown, Ohio and grew up in Houston, Texas. Rodowick never planned to attend university and from his teenage years pursued a career as a musician and singer-songwriter. For a brief period he was a protégé of the country rock innovator Gram Parsons, before Parsons's death in September 1973.

Rodowick took occasional classes at the University of Houston and the University of St. Thomas. In 1974, he began his studies in earnest at the University of Texas at Austin, where he combined coursework in comparative literature, Romance languages, world dramatic literature, and film studies. From 1977 to 1978, he studied at the Centre Américain d’études critiques in Paris and the Université de Paris III (Nouvelle Sorbonne), working primarily with Raymond Bellour. Rodowick completed his Ph.D. in cinema and critical theory at the University of Iowa in 1983 under the supervision of Dudley Andrew, while studying experimental film and video making with Franklin Miller.

== Career ==
Rodowick has taught at Yale University, the University of Rochester, King’s College, University of London, and Harvard University, where he was named William R. Kenan, Jr. Professor of Visual and Environmental Studies. At Harvard, he also served as chair of the Department of Visual and Environmental Studies (now Art, Film, and Visual Studies) and director of the Carpenter Center for the Visual Arts. He is currently Glen A. Lloyd Distinguished Service Professor Emeritus at the University of Chicago where he has also served as academic director for the University of Chicago Center in Paris. Rodowick has been a visiting professor at the Institut für Geschichte, Universität Wien, Vienna, Austria and at the Université Sorbonne Nouvelle—Paris 3, Paris, France. He is currently an International Associate of the Kolleg-Forschungsgruppe Cinepoetics at the Freie Universität Berlin. He has also held fellowships at Cornell University’s Society for the Humanities and the Internationale Kolleg für Kulturtechnikforschung und Medienphilosophie at the Bauhaus-Universität, Germany.

Rodowick was among the first scholars to write critical accounts in English of the French philosopher, Gilles Deleuze, especially in the context of international film theory and philosophies of the image. He is also known for his critique of political modernism in post-1968 film and literary theory as well as his genealogical investigations of the history of theory in general as a vexed concept in art and aesthetics. Rodowick is perhaps best known for his work on the aesthetic consequences of the global replacement of analogue technologies and representations by digital means and media. Expanding on Jean-François Lyotard’s concept of the figural as an aesthetic order where the ontological distinction between linguistic and plastic representation breaks down, he has written extensively on contemporary art and the new electronic, televisual, and digital media. Since 2014, in several books Rodowick has been developing a philosophy of the humanities inspired by Ludwig Wittgenstein, Stanley Cavell, Richard Rorty, Georg Henrik von Wright, Charles Taylor, and Hannah Arendt.

== Books ==
- The Crisis of Political Modernism: Criticism and Ideology in Contemporary Film Theory. Urbana: University of Illinois Press, 1988. Second, paperback edition published with a new Introduction. Berkeley: University of California Press, 1994. ISBN 0520087712.
- The Difficulty of Difference: Psychoanalysis, Sexual Difference, and Film Theory. New York: Routledge, 1991. ISBN 0415903327.
- Gilles Deleuze's Time Machine. Durham: Duke University Press, 1997. ISBN 0816650071
- Reading the Figural, or, Philosophy after the New Media. Durham: Duke University Press, 2001. ISBN 0822327228.
- The Virtual Life of Film. Cambridge: Harvard University Press, 2007. ISBN 0674026985.
- Editor. Afterimages of Gilles Deleuze’s Film Philosophy. Minneapolis: University of Minnesota Press, 2009. ISBN 0816650071.
- Elegy for Theory. Cambridge: Harvard University Press, 2014. Winner of the 2015 Katherine Singer Kovács Award for Best Book in Cinema Studies.
- Philosophy’s Artful Conversation. Cambridge: Harvard University Press, 2015. ISBN 0674416678.
- What Philosophy Wants from Images. Chicago: University of Chicago Press, 2018. {{ISBN|022651319X}}.
- An Education in the Judgment: Hannah Arendt and the Humanities. Chicago: University of Chicago Press, 2022. ISBN 022678021X.
