= French Directory =

Executive power of the French Constitution of 1795–1799

Directory of the First French Republic
- Première République Directoire (French)
- Style: "His Excellency"
- Type: Directorial government
- Status: Disestablished
- Abbreviation: The Directory
- Seat: Luxembourg Palace, Paris
- Nominator: Council of Five Hundred
- Appointer: Council of Ancients
- Term length: Variable by election date
- Constituting instrument: Constitution of the Year III
- Precursor: Committee of Public Safety
- Formation: 26/31 October 1795
- Abolished: 9 November 1799
- Succession: Executive Consulate

The Directory (also called Directorate; French: le Directoire [diʁɛktwaʁ]) was the system of government established by the French Constitution of 1795. It takes its name from the committee of five men vested with executive power. The Directory governed the French First Republic from 26 October 1795 (4 Brumaire an IV) until 9 November 1799, when it was overthrown by Napoleon Bonaparte in the Coup of 18 Brumaire and replaced by the Consulate.

The Directory was continually at war with foreign coalitions, including Britain, Austria, Prussia, the Kingdom of Naples, Russia and the Ottoman Empire. It annexed Belgium and the left bank of the Rhine, while Bonaparte conquered a large part of Italy. The Directory established 29 short-lived sister republics in Italy, Switzerland and the Netherlands. The conquered cities and states were required to send France huge amounts of money, as well as art treasures, which were used to fill the new Louvre museum in Paris. An army led by Bonaparte tried to conquer Egypt and marched as far as Saint-Jean-d'Acre in Syria. The Directory defeated a resurgence of the War in the Vendée, the royalist-led civil war in the Vendée region, but failed in its venture to support the Irish Rebellion of 1798 and create an Irish Republic.

The French economy was in continual crisis during the Directory. At the beginning, the treasury was empty; the paper money, the assignat, had fallen to a fraction of its value, and prices soared. The Directory stopped printing assignats and restored the value of the money, but this caused a new crisis; prices and wages fell, and economic activity slowed to a standstill.

In its first two years, the Directory concentrated on ending the excesses of the Jacobin Reign of Terror; mass executions stopped, and measures taken against exiled priests and royalists were relaxed. The Jacobin political club was closed on 12 November 1794 and the government crushed an armed uprising planned by the Jacobins and an early socialist revolutionary, François-Noël Babeuf, known as "Gracchus Babeuf". But after the discovery of a royalist conspiracy including a prominent general, Jean-Charles Pichegru, the Jacobins took charge of the new Councils and hardened the measures against the Church and émigrés. They took two additional seats in the Directory, hopelessly dividing it.

In 1799, after several defeats, French victories in the Netherlands and Switzerland restored the French military position, but the Directory had lost all the political factions' support, including some of its Directors. Bonaparte returned from Egypt in October, and was engaged by Abbé Sieyès and others to carry out a parliamentary coup d'état on 9–10 November 1799. The coup abolished the Directory and replaced it with the French Consulate led by Bonaparte.

== Background ==
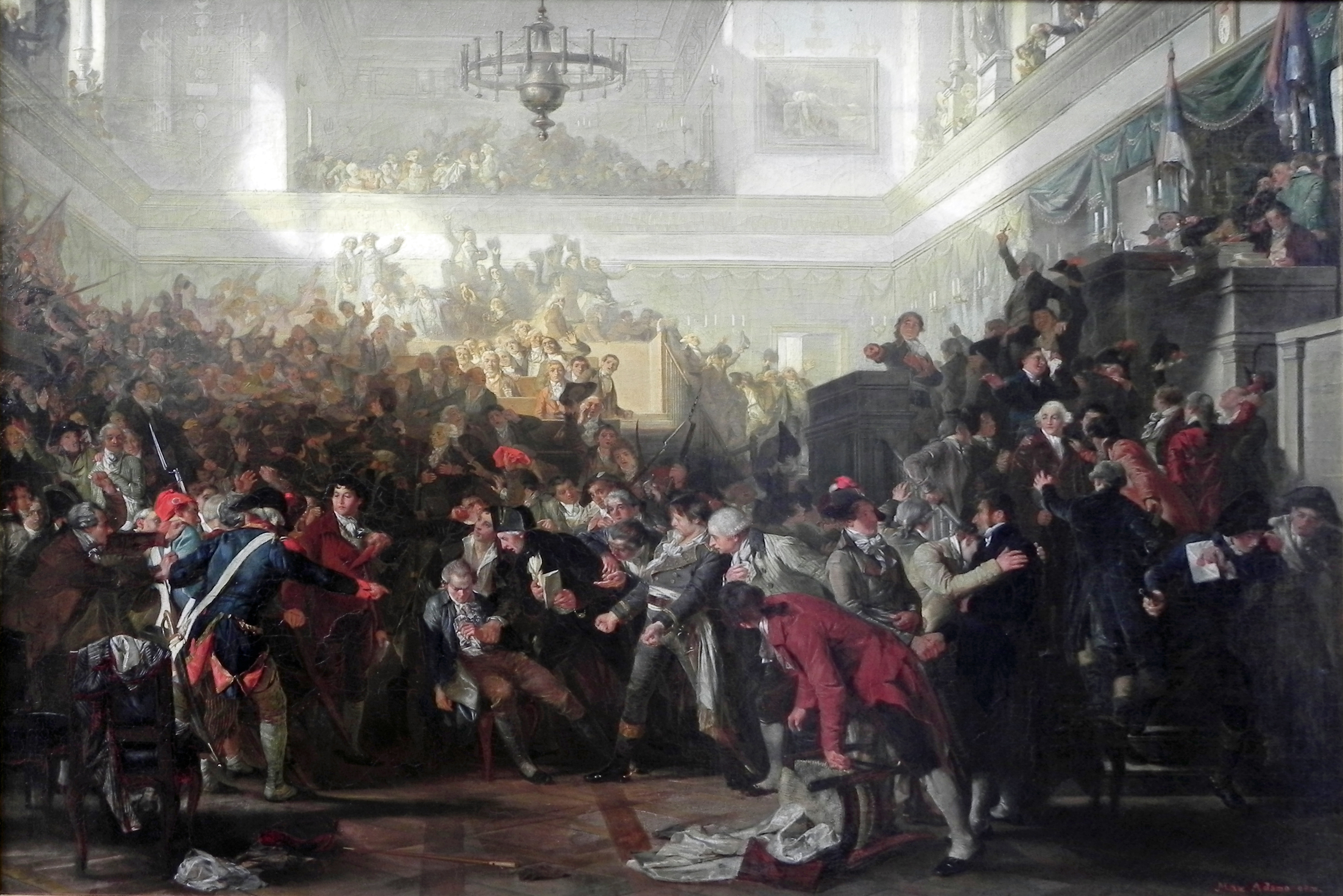
The Convention rises against Robespierre (27 July 1794)

The period known as the Reign of Terror began as a way of harnessing revolutionary fervour, but quickly degenerated into the settlement of personal grievances. On 17 September 1793, the Law of Suspects authorised the arrest of any suspected "enemies of freedom"; on 10 October, the National Convention recognised the Committee of Public Safety under Maximilien Robespierre as the supreme authority, and suspended the Constitution until "peace was achieved".

According to archival records, from September 1793 to July 1794 some 16,600 people were executed on charges of counter-revolutionary activity; another 40,000 may have been summarily executed or died awaiting trial. At its peak, the slightest hint of counter-revolutionary thoughts could place one under suspicion, and even his supporters began to fear their own survival depended on removing Robespierre. On 27 July, he and his allies were arrested and executed the next day.

In July 1794, the Convention established a committee to draft what became the 1795 Constitution. Largely designed by Pierre Daunou and Boissy d'Anglas, it established a bicameral legislature, intended to slow down the legislative process, ending the wild swings of policy under the previous unicameral systems. Deputies were chosen by indirect election, a total franchise of around 5 million voting in primaries for 30,000 electors, or 0.5% of the population. Since they were also subject to stringent property qualification, it guaranteed the return of conservative or moderate deputies.

The Directory was established after the Constitution of Year III which was adopted by a referendum on 24 September 1795, and constituted after the first elections which were held from 12–21 October 1795. On 25 October the National Convention held its last meeting; the Committee of Public Safety was dissolved or rather disappeared before the end of the month. On 31 October, in addition to Paul Barras, Jean-François Rewbell, Louis-Marie de La Révellière-Lépeaux, Étienne-François Le Tourneur and Emmanuel-Joseph Sieyès were chosen as Directors.

At the end of October a legislature consisting of the Council of 500 was created, responsible for drafting legislation, and Council of Ancients, an upper house containing 250 men over the age of 40, who would review and approve it. Executive power was in the hands of five Directors, selected by the Council of Ancients from a list provided by the lower house, with a five-year mandate. This was intended to prevent executive power being concentrated in the hands of one man.

D'Anglas wrote to the Convention:

We propose to you to compose an executive power of five members, renewed with one new member each year, called the Directory. This executive will have a force concentrated enough that it will be swift and firm, but divided enough to make it impossible for any member to even consider becoming a tyrant. A single chief would be dangerous. Each member will preside for three months; he will have during this time the signature and seal of the head of state. By the slow and gradual replacement of members of the Directory, you will preserve the advantages of order and continuity and will have the advantages of unity without the inconveniences.

=== Drafting the new Constitution ===
The 1789 Declaration of the Rights of Man and of the Citizen was attached as a preamble, declaring "the Rights of Man in society are liberty, equality, security, and property". It guaranteed freedom of religion, freedom of the press, and freedom of labour, but forbade armed assemblies and even public meetings of political societies. Only individuals or public authorities could tender petitions.

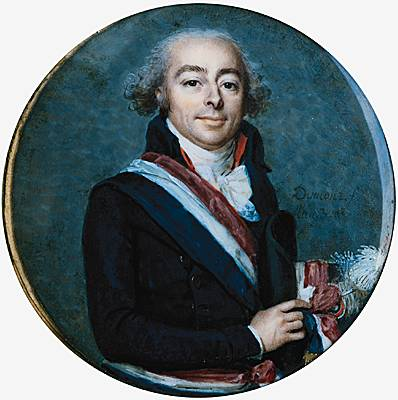
François Antoine de Boissy d'Anglas, one of the principal authors of the Constitution of 1795

The judicial system was reformed, and judges were given short terms of office: two years for justices of the peace, five for judges of department tribunals. They were elected, and could be re-elected, to assure their independence from the other branches of government.

The new legislature had two houses, a Council of Five Hundred and a Council of Ancients with two hundred fifty members. Electoral assemblies in each canton of France, which brought together a total of thirty thousand qualified electors, chose representatives to an electoral assembly in each department, which then elected the members of both houses. The members of this legislature had a term of three years, with one-third of the members renewed every year. The Ancients could not initiate new laws, but could veto those proposed by the Council of Five Hundred.

The Constitution established a unique kind of executive, a five-man Directory chosen by the legislature. It required the Council of Five Hundred to prepare, by secret ballot, a list of candidates for the Directory. The Council of Ancients then chose, again by secret ballot, the Directors from that provided list. The Constitution required that Directors be at least forty years old. To assure gradual but continual change, one Director, chosen by lot, was replaced each year. Ministers for the various departments of State aided the Directors. These ministers did not form a council or cabinet and had no general powers of government.

The new Constitution sought to create a separation of powers; the Directors had no voice in legislation or taxation, nor could Directors or Ministers sit in either house. To assure that the Directors would have some independence, each would be elected by one portion of the legislature, and they could not be removed by the legislature unless they violated the law.

Under the new Constitution of 1795, to be eligible to vote in the elections for the Councils, voters were required to meet certain minimum property and residency standards. In towns with over six thousand population, they had to own or rent a property with a revenue equal to the standard income for at least one hundred fifty or two hundred days of work, and to have lived in their residence for at least a year. This ruled out a large part of the French population.

The greatest victim under the new system was the City of Paris, which had dominated events in the first part of the Revolution. On 24 August 1794, the committees of the sections of Paris, bastions of the Jacobins which had provided most of the manpower for demonstrations and invasions of the Convention, were abolished. Shortly afterwards, on 31 August, the municipality of Paris, which had been the domain of Danton and Robespierre, was abolished, and the city placed under direct control of the national government. When the Law of 19 Vendémiaire Year IV (11 October 1795), in application of the new Constitution, created the first twelve arrondissements of Paris, it established twelve new committees, one for each arrondissement. The city became a new department, the Department of the Seine, replacing the former Department of Paris created in 1790.

=== Political developments (July 1794 – March 1795) ===
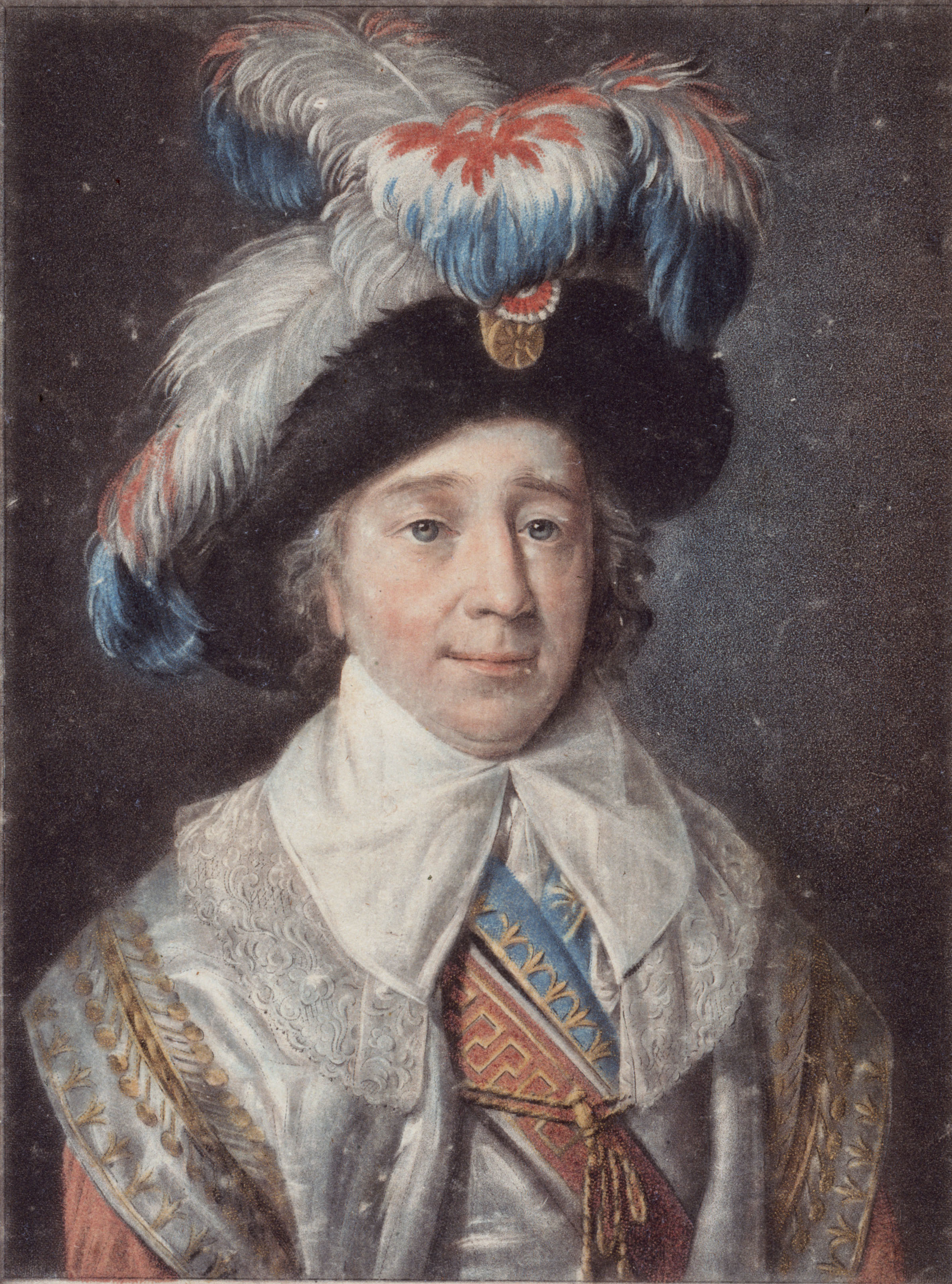
Paul Barras, President of Directory (1798-1799)

Meanwhile, the leaders of the still ruling National Convention tried to meet challenges from both neo-Jacobins on the left and royalists on the right. On 21 September 1794, the remains of Jean-Paul Marat, whose furious articles had promoted the Reign of Terror, were placed with great ceremony in the Panthéon, while on the same day, the moderate Convention member Merlin de Thionville described the Jacobins as "A hangout of outlaws" and the "knights of the guillotine". Young men known as Muscadins, largely from middle-class families, attacked the Jacobin and radical clubs. The new freedom of the press saw the appearance of a host of new newspapers and pamphlets from the left and the right, such as the royalist L'Orateur du peuple edited by Stanislas Fréron, an extreme Jacobin who had moved to the extreme right, and at the opposite end of the spectrum, the Tribun du peuple, edited by Gracchus Babeuf, a former priest who advocated an early version of socialism. On 5 February 1795, the semi-official newspaper Le Moniteur Universel (Le Moniteur) attacked Marat for encouraging the bloody extremes of the Reign of Terror. Marat's remains were removed from the Panthéon two days later. The surviving Girondin deputies, whose leaders had been executed during the Reign of Terror, were brought back into the Convention on 8 March 1795.

The Convention tried to bring a peaceful end to the Catholic and royalist uprising in the Vendée. The Convention signed an amnesty agreement, promising to recognize the freedom of religion and allowing territorial guards to keep their weapons if the Vendéens would end their revolt. On a proposal from Boissy d'Anglas, on 21 February 1795 the Convention formally proclaimed the freedom of religion and the separation of church and state.

=== Foreign policy ===
Between July 1794 and the October 1795 elections for the new-style Parliament, the government tried to obtain international peace treaties and secure French gains. In January 1795 General Pichegru took advantage of an extremely cold winter and invaded the Dutch Republic. He captured Utrecht on 18 January, and on 14 February units of French cavalry captured the Dutch fleet, which was trapped in the ice at Den Helder. The Dutch government asked for peace, conceding Dutch Flanders, Maastricht and Venlo to France. On 9 February, after a French offensive in the Alps, Ferdinand III, Grand Duke of Tuscany signed a treaty with France. Soon afterwards, on 5 April, France signed a peace treaty, the Peace of Basel, with Prussia, where King Frederick William II was tired of the war; Prussia recognized the French occupation of the western bank of the Rhine. On 22 July 1795, a peace agreement, the "Treaty of Basel", was signed with Spain, where the French Revolutionary Army had marched as far as Bilbao in the War of the Pyrenees. By the time the Directory was chosen, the coalition against France was reduced to Britain and Austria, which hoped that Russia might be brought in on its side.

=== Failed Jacobin coup (May 1795) and rebellion in Brittany (June–July) ===
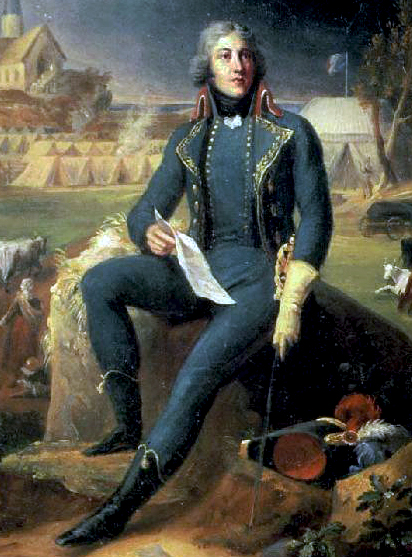
General Lazare Hoche defeated a royalist army that landed in Brittany (July 1795)

On 20 May 1795 (1 Prairial Year III), the Jacobins attempted to seize power in Paris. Following the model of Danton's seizure of the National Assembly in June 1792, a mob of sans-culottes invaded the meeting hall of the Convention at the Tuileries Palace, killed one deputy, and demanded that a new government be formed. This time the army moved swiftly to clear the hall. Several deputies who had taken the side of the invaders were arrested. The uprising continued the following day, as the sans-culottes seized the Hôtel de Ville as they had done in earlier uprisings, but with little effect; crowds did not move to support them. On the third day, 22 May, the army moved into and occupied the working-class neighborhood of the Faubourg Saint-Antoine. The sans-culottes were disarmed and their leaders were arrested. In the following days the surviving members of the Committee of Public Safety, the committee that had been led by Robespierre, were arrested, with the exception of Carnot and two others. Six of the deputies who had participated in the uprising and had been sentenced to death committed suicide before they were taken to the guillotine.

On 23 June 1795, the Chouans, royalist and Catholic rebels in Brittany, formed an army of 14,000 men near Quiberon. With the assistance of the British navy, a force of two thousand royalists was landed at Quiberon. The French army under General Lazare Hoche reacted swiftly, forcing the royalists to take refuge on the peninsula and then to withdraw. They surrendered on 21 July; 748 of the rebels were executed by firing squad.

=== Adoption of the new Constitution ===
The new Constitution of the Year III was presented to the Convention and debated between 4 July – 17 August 1795, and was formally adopted on 22 August 1795. It was a long document, with 377 articles, compared with 124 in the first French Constitution of 1793. Even before it took effect, however, the members of the Convention took measures to assure they would still have dominance in the legislature over the government. They required that in the first elections, two hundred and fifty new deputies would be elected, while five hundred members of the old Convention would remain in place until the next elections. A national referendum of eligible voters was then held. The total number of voters was low; of five million eligible voters, 1,057,390 electors approved the Constitution, and 49,978 opposed it. The proposal that two thirds of members of the old Convention should remain in place was approved by a much smaller margin, 205,498 to 108,754.

=== October 1795 royalist rebellion ===
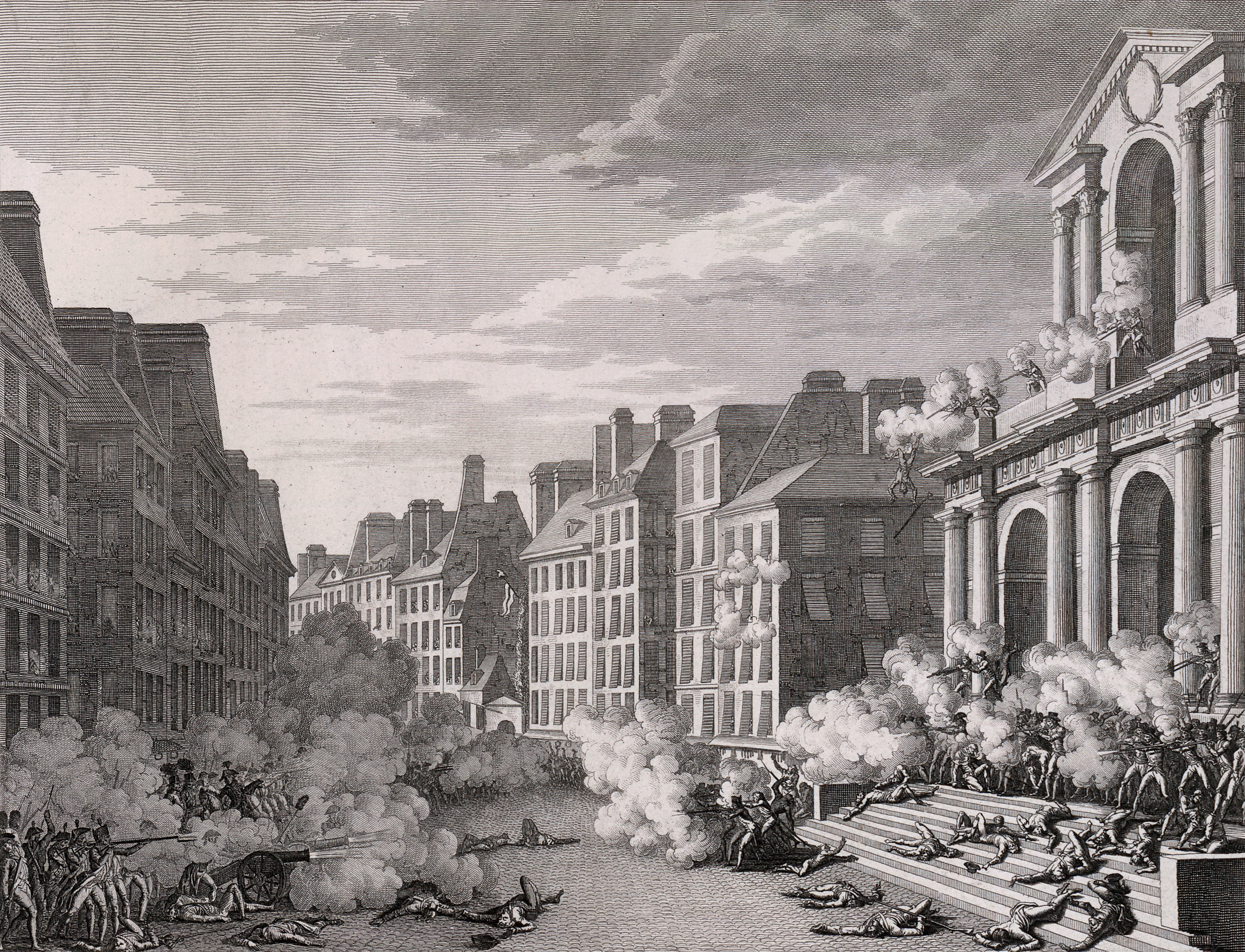
Government troops under Napoleon fire on insurgents near Saint-Roch, Paris, 5 October 1795

The new Constitution of the Year III was officially proclaimed in force on 23 September 1795, but the new Councils had not yet been elected, and the Directors had not yet been chosen. The leaders of the royalists and constitutional monarchists chose this moment to try to seize power. They saw that the vote in favor of the new Constitution was hardly overwhelming. Paris voters were particularly hostile to the idea of keeping two-thirds of the old members of the Convention in the new Councils. A central committee was formed, with members from the wealthier neighborhoods of Paris, and they began planning a march on the center of the city and on the Tuileries, where the Convention still met.

The members of the Convention, very much experienced with conspiracies, were well aware that the planning was underway. A group of five republican deputies, led by Paul Barras, had already formed an unofficial directory, in anticipation of the creation of the real one. They were concerned about the National Guard members from western Paris, and were unsure about the military commander of Paris, General Jacques-François Menou. Barras decided to turn to military commanders in his entourage who were known republicans, particularly Napoleon Bonaparte, whom he had known when Bonaparte was successfully fighting the British in Toulon. Bonaparte, at this point a general of second rank in the Army of the Interior, was ordered to defend the government buildings on the right bank.

The armed royalist insurgents planned a march in two columns along both the right bank and left bank of the Seine toward the Tuileries. There on 5 October 1795, the royalists were met by the artillery of sous-lieutenant Joachim Murat at the Sablons and by Bonaparte's soldiers and artillery in front of the church of Saint-Roch. Over the next two hours, the "whiff of grapeshot" of Bonaparte's cannons and gunfire of his soldiers brutally mowed down advancing columns, killing some four hundred insurgents, and ending the rebellion. Bonaparte was promoted to General of Division on 16 October, and General in Chief of the Army of the Interior on 26 October. It was the last uprising to take place in Paris during the French Revolution.

== History ==
=== Directory takes charge ===
Between 12 and 21 October 1795, immediately after the suppression of royalist uprising in Paris, the elections for the new Councils decreed by the new Constitution took place. 379 members of the old Convention, for the most part moderate republicans, were elected to the new legislature. To assure that the Directory did not abandon the Revolution entirely, the Council required that all of the members of the Directory be former members of the Convention and regicides, those who had voted for the execution of Louis XVI.

Due to the rules established by the Convention, a majority of members of the new legislature, 381 of 741 deputies, had served in the Convention and were ardent republicans, but a large part of the new deputies elected were royalists, 118 versus 11 from the left. The members of the upper house, the Council of Ancients, were chosen by lot from among all of the deputies.

On 31 October 1795, the Council of Ancients chose the first Directory from a list of candidates submitted by the Council of Five Hundred. One person elected, the Abbé Sieyès, refused to take the position, saying it didn't suit his interests or personality. A new member, Lazare Carnot, was elected in his place.

The members elected to the Directory were the following:

- Paul François Jean Nicolas, vicomte de Barras, a member of a minor noble family from Provence, Barras had been a revolutionary envoy to Toulon, where he met the young Bonaparte, and arranged his promotion to captain. Barras had been removed from the Committee of Public Safety by Robespierre. Fearing for his life, Barras had helped organize the downfall of Robespierre. An expert at political intrigue, Barras became the dominant figure in the Directory. His leading opponent in the Directory, Carnot, described him as "without faith and without morals... in politics, without character and without resolution... He has all the tastes of an opulent prince, generous, magnificent and dissipated."
- Louis Marie de La Révellière-Lépeaux was a fierce republican and anti-Catholic, who had proposed to execute Louis XVI after the flight to Varennes. He promoted the establishment of a new religion, theophilanthropy, to replace Christianity.
- Jean-François Rewbell had an expertise in foreign relations, and was a close ally of Paul Barras. He was a firm moderate republican who had voted for the death of the king but had also opposed Robespierre and the extreme Jacobins. He was an opponent of the Catholic church and a proponent of individual liberties.
- Étienne-François Le Tourneur was a former captain of engineers, and a specialist in military and naval affairs. He was a close ally within the Directory of Carnot.
- Lazare Nicolas Marguerite Carnot took the place of Abbé Sieyés, who was elected by the Ancients but refused the position. Carnot was an army captain at the beginning of the Revolution, and when elected to the Convention became a member of the commission of military affairs, as well as a vocal opponent of Robespierre. He was an energetic and efficient manager, who restructured the French military and helped it achieve its first successes, earning him the title of "The Organizer of the Victory". Napoleon, who later made Carnot his Minister of War, described him as "a hard worker, sincere in everything, but without intrigues, and easy to fool."

The following day, the members of the new government took over their offices in the Luxembourg Palace, which had previously been occupied by the Committee of Public Safety. Nothing had been prepared, and the rooms had no furniture: they managed to find firewood to heat the room, and a table in order to work. Each member took charge of a particular sector: Rewbell diplomacy; Carnot and Le Tourneur military affairs, La Révellière-Lépeaux religion and public instruction, and Barras internal affairs.

The Council of Ancients was attributed the building at the Tuileries Palace formerly occupied by the Convention, while the Council of Five Hundred deliberated in the Salle du Manège, the former riding school west of the palace in the Tuileries Garden. One of the early decisions of the new parliament was to designate uniforms for both houses: the Five Hundred wore long white robes with a blue belt, a scarlet cloak and a hat of blue velour, while members of the Ancients wore a robe of blue-violet, a scarlet sash, a white mantle, and a violet hat.

==== Gallery ====
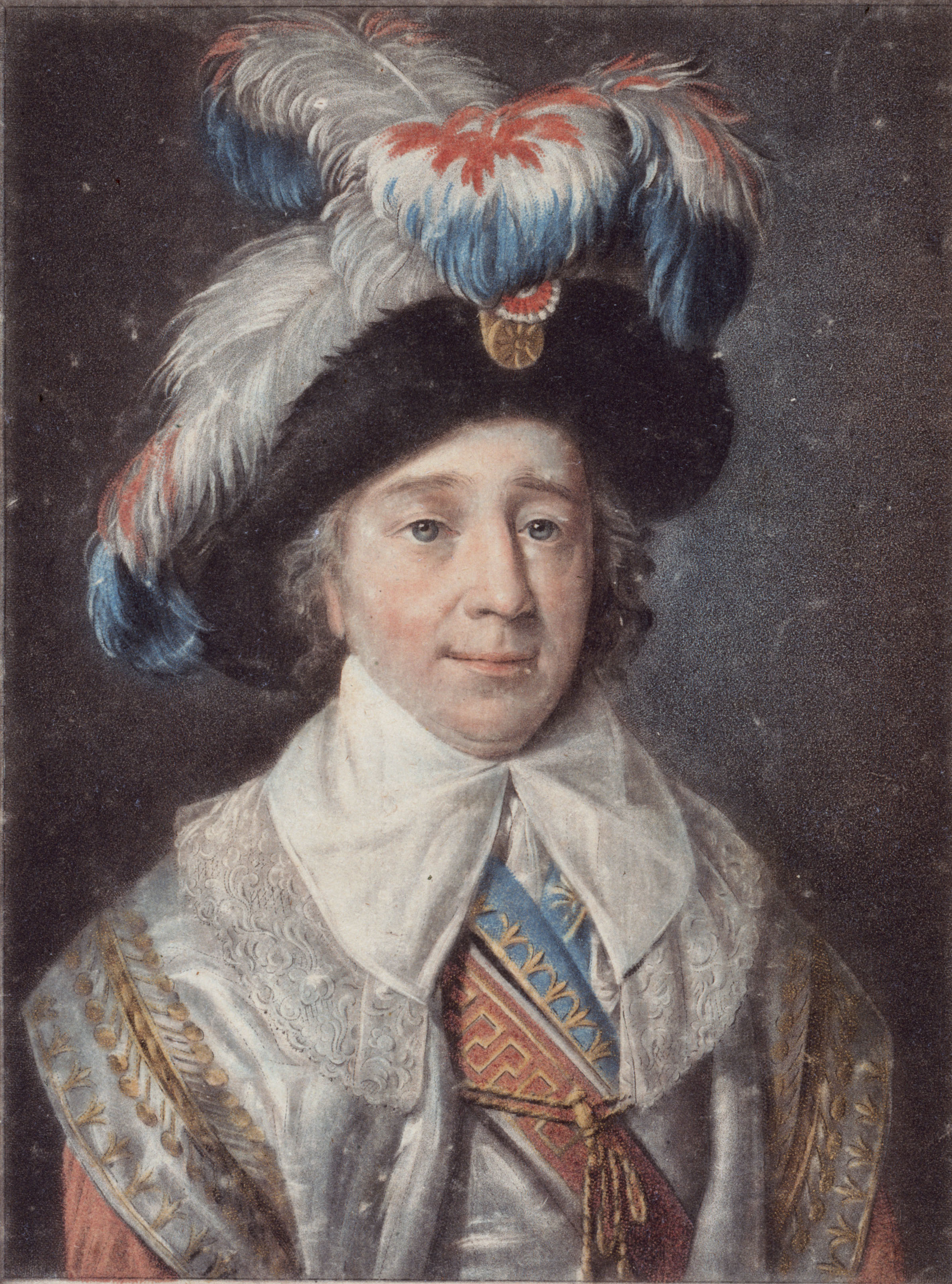
Paul Barras (here in the ceremonial dress of a Director) was a master of political intrigue

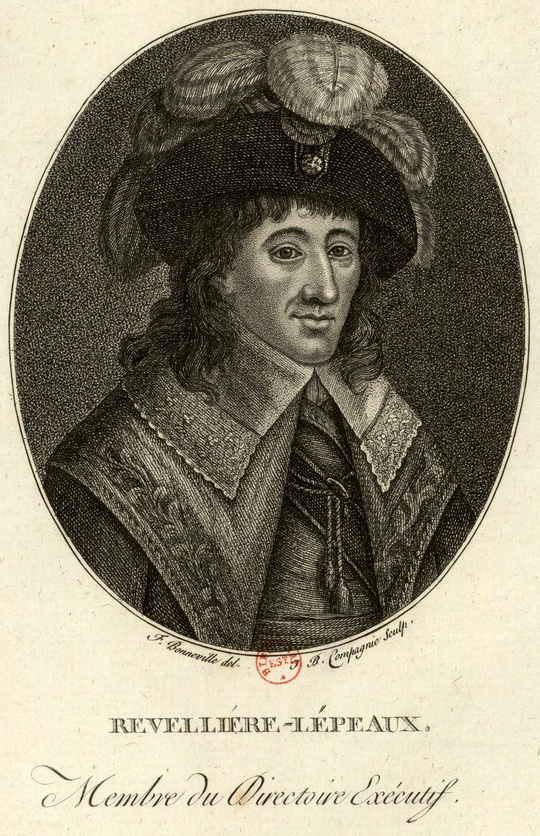
Louis Marie de La Révellière-Lépeaux

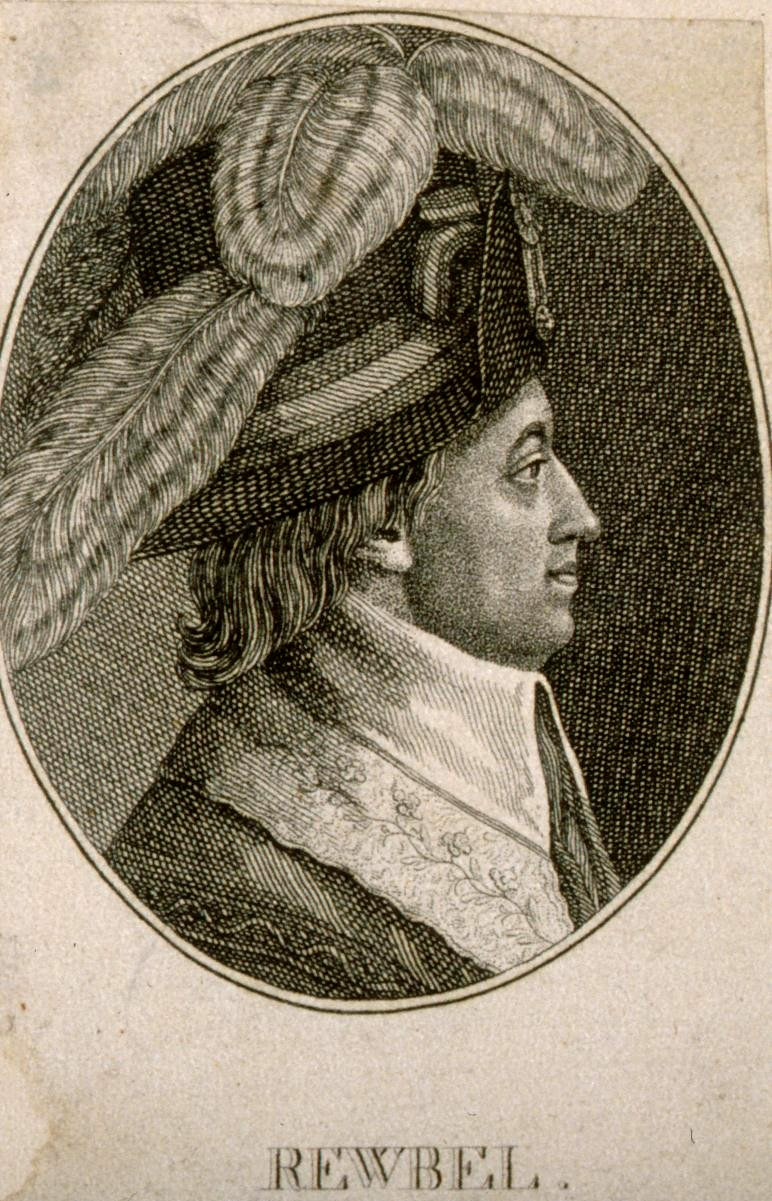
Jean-François Rewbell

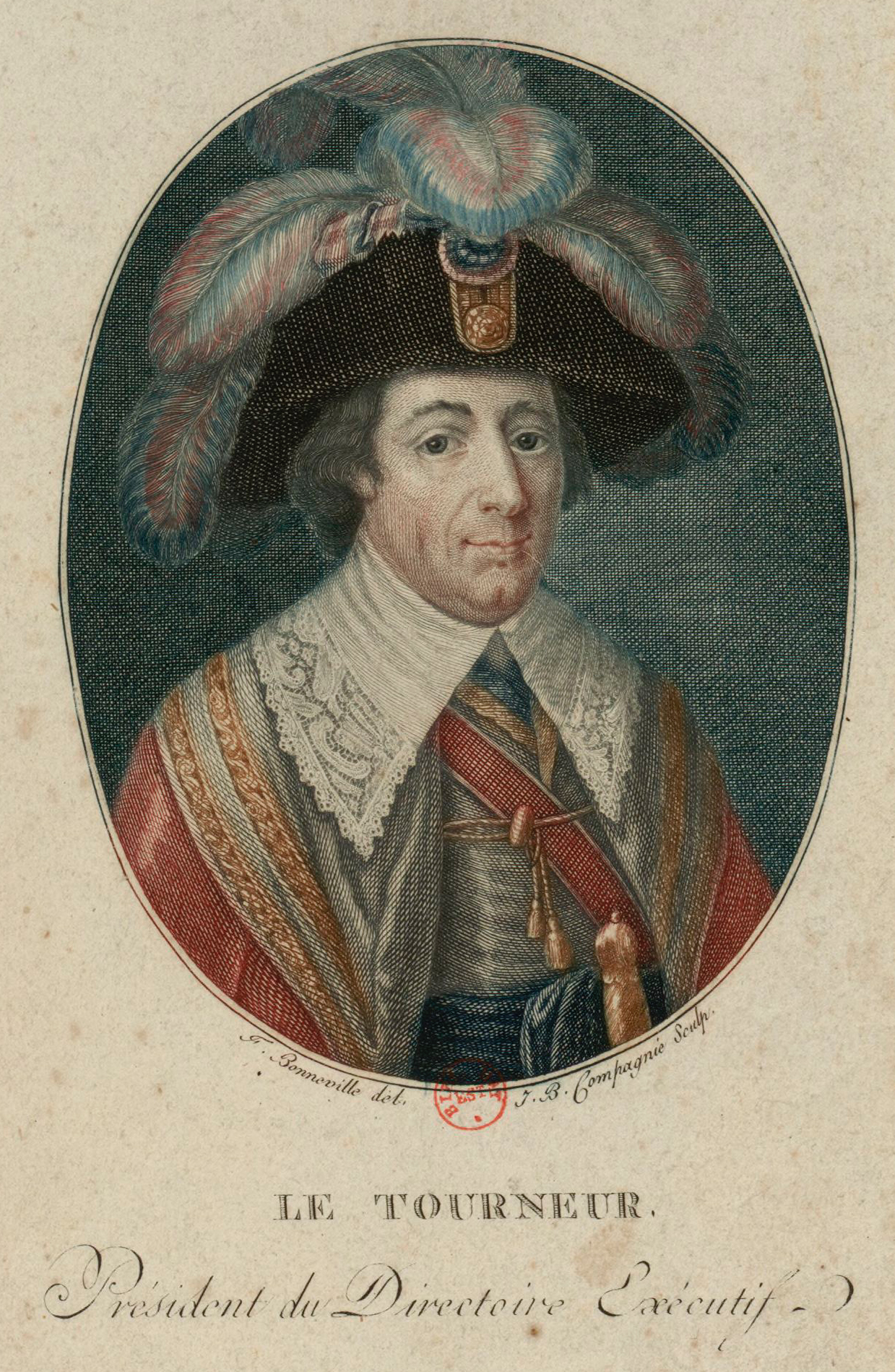
Étienne-François Le Tourneur

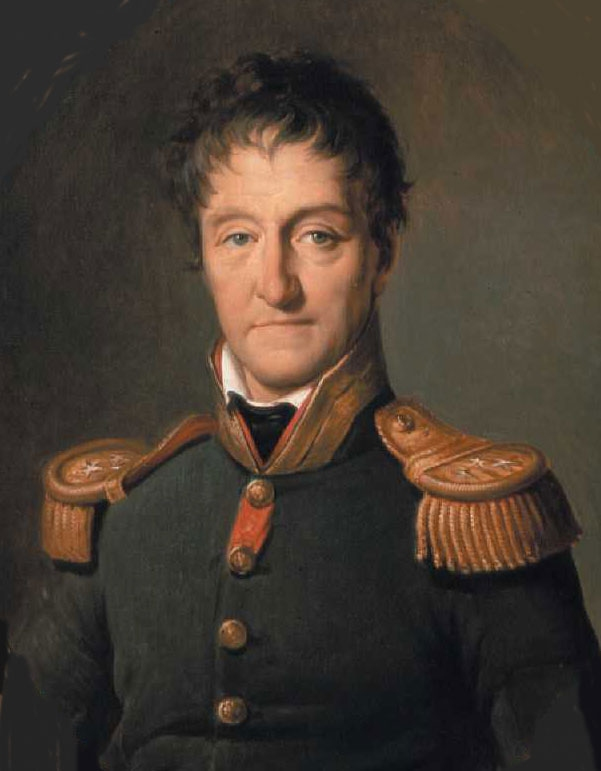
Lazare Carnot, a brilliant organizer and mathematician but poor intriguer, was the enemy of Barras

=== Finance and economy ===
The new Director overseeing financial affairs, La Réveillière-Lépeaux, gave a succinct description of the financial state of France when the Directory took power: "The national Treasury was completely empty; not a single sou remained. The assignats were almost worthless; the little value which remained drained away each day with accelerated speed. One could not print enough money in one night to meet the most pressing needs of the next day.... The public revenues were nonexistent; citizens had lost the habit of paying taxes. [...] All public credit was dead and all confidence lost. [...] The depreciation of the assignats, the frightening speed of the fall, reduced the salary of all public employees and functionaries to a value which was purely nominal."

The drop in value in the money was accompanied by extraordinary inflation. The Louis d'or (gold coin), which was worth 2,000₶. in paper money at the beginning of the Directory, increased to 3,000₶. and then 5,000₶. The price of a liter of wine increased from 2₶.10s. in October 1795 to 10₶. and then 30₶. A measure of flour worth 2₶. in 1790 was worth 225₶. in October 1794.

The new government continued to print assignats, which were based on the value of property confiscated from the Church and the aristocracy, but it could not print them fast enough; even when it printed one hundred million in a day, it covered only one-third of the government's needs. To fill the treasury, the Directory resorted in December 1795 to a forced loan of 600 million-₶. from wealthy citizens, who were required to pay between 50₶. and 6,000₶. each.

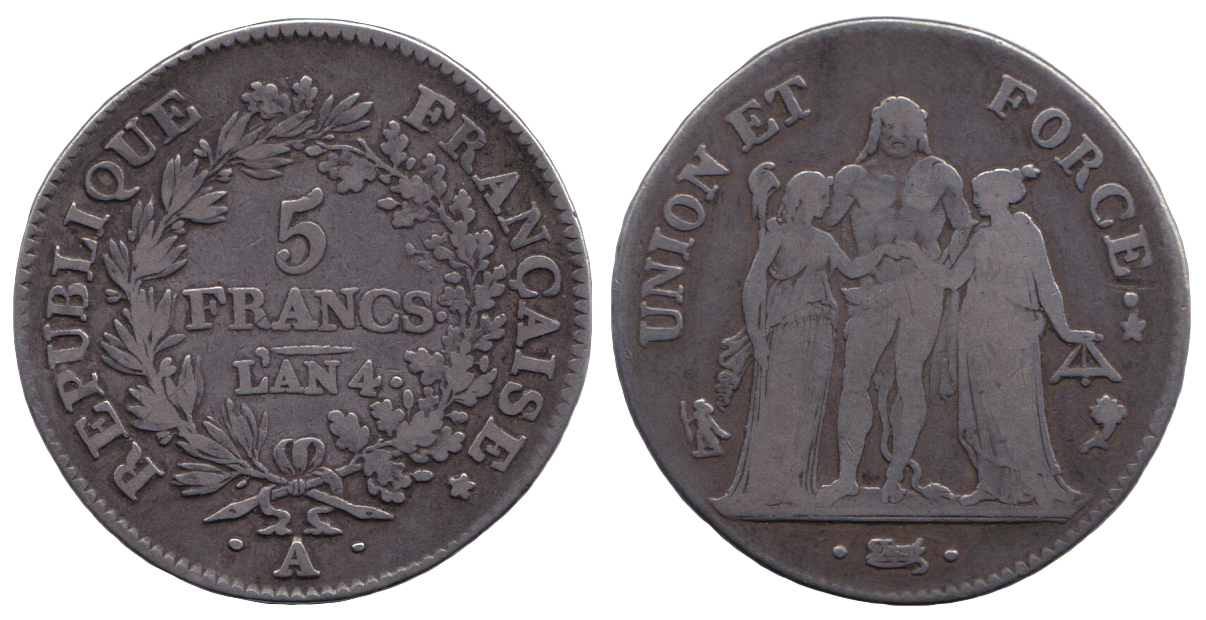
Silver 5 francs, Directory. First year of minting (L'AN 4.)

To fight inflation, the government began minting more coins of gold and silver, which had real value; the government had little gold but large silver reserves, largely in the form of silverware, candlesticks and other objects confiscated from the churches and the nobility. It minted 72 million écus, and when this silver supply ran low, it obtained much more gold and silver through military campaigns outside of France, particularly from Bonaparte's army in Italy. Bonaparte demanded gold or silver from each city he conquered, threatening to destroy the cities if they did not pay.

These measures reduced the rate of inflation. On 19 February 1796, the government held a ceremony in the Place Vendôme to destroy the printing presses which had been used to produce huge quantities of assignats. This success produced a new problem: the country was still flooded with more than two billion four hundred million (2.400.000.000) assignats, claims on confiscated properties, which now had some value. Those who held assignats were able to exchange them for state mandates, which they could use to buy châteaux, church buildings and other biens nationaux (state property) at extremely reduced prices. Speculation became rampant, and property in Paris and other cities could change hands several times a day.

Another major problem faced by the Directory was the enormous public debt, the same problem that had led to the Revolution in the first place. In September–December 1797, the Directory attacked this problem by declaring bankruptcy on two-thirds of the debt, but assured payment on the other third. This resulted in the ruin of those who held large quantities of government bonds, but stabilized the currency. To keep the treasury full, the Directory also imposed new taxes on property owners, based on the number of fireplaces and chimneys, and later on the number of windows, of their residences. It refrained from adding more taxes on wine and salt, which had helped cause the 1789 revolution, but added new taxes on gold and silver objects, playing cards, tobacco, and other luxury products. Through these means, the Directory brought about a relative stability of finances which continued through the Directory and Consulate.

=== Food supply ===
The food supply for the population, and particularly for the Parisians, was a major economic and political problem before and during the Revolution; it had led to food riots in Paris and attacks on the Convention. To assure the supply of food to the sans-culottes in Paris, the base of support of the Jacobins, the Convention had strictly regulated grain distribution and set maximum prices for bread and other essential products. As the value of the currency dropped, the fixed prices soon did not cover the cost of production, and supplies dropped. The Convention was forced to abolish the maximum on 24 December 1794, but it continued to buy huge quantities of bread and meat which it distributed at low prices to the Parisians. This Paris food distribution cost a large part of the national budget, and was resented by the rest of the country, which did not have that benefit. By early 1796, the grain supply was supplemented by deliveries from Italy and even from Algeria. Despite the increased imports, the grain supply to Paris was not enough. The Ministry of the Interior reported on 23 March 1796 that there was only enough wheat to make bread for five days, and there were shortages of meat and firewood. The Directory was forced to resume deliveries of subsidized food to the very poor, the elderly, the sick, and government employees. The food shortages and high prices were one factor in the growth of discontent and the Gracchus Babeuf's uprising, the Conspiracy of the Equals, in 1796. The harvests were good in the following years and the food supplies improved considerably, but the supply was still precarious in the north, the west, the southeast, and the valley of the Seine.

=== Babeuf's Conspiracy of the Equals ===
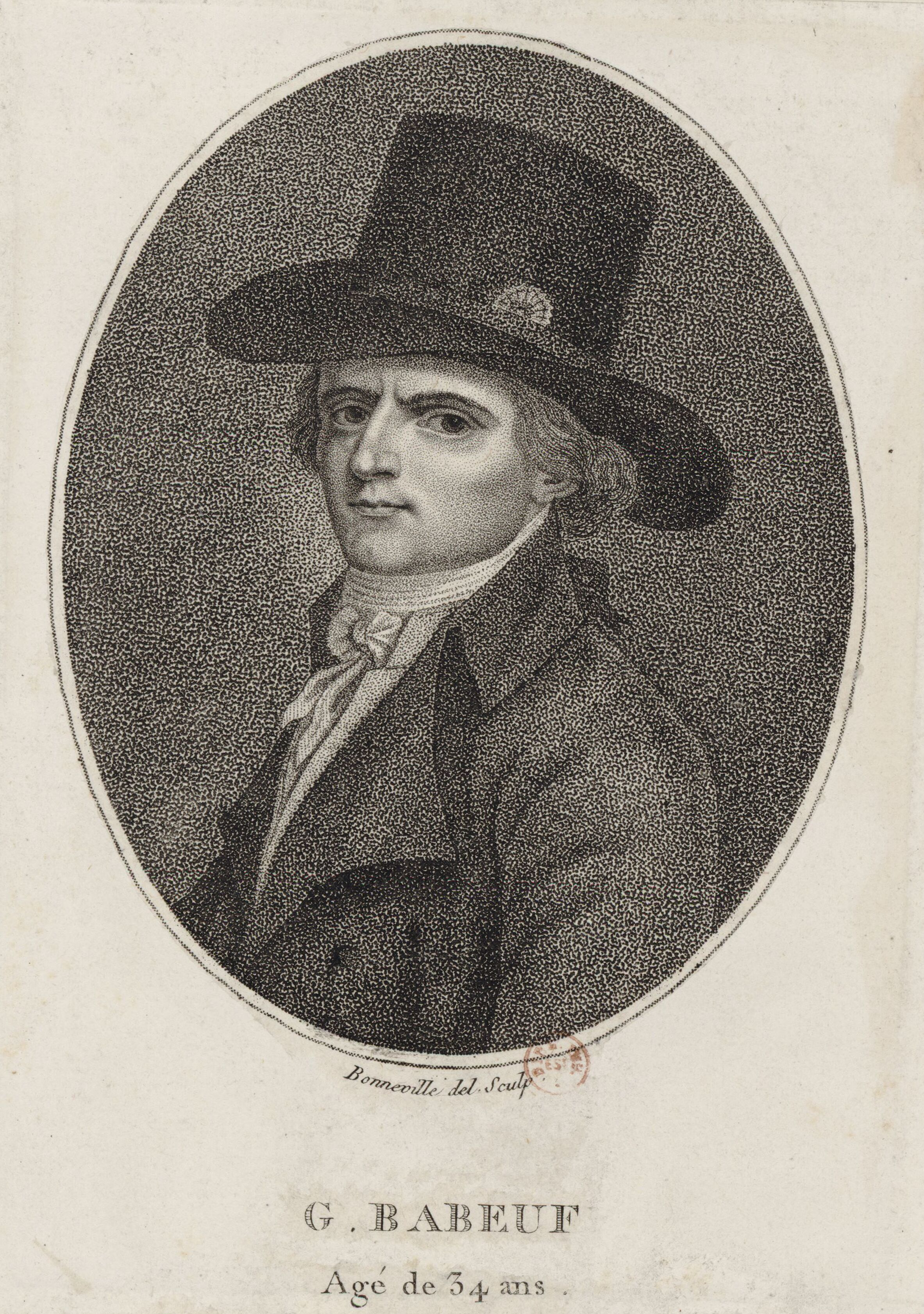
François Noël Babeuf, engraving by François Bonneville, 1794 (BNF, Département des Estampes)

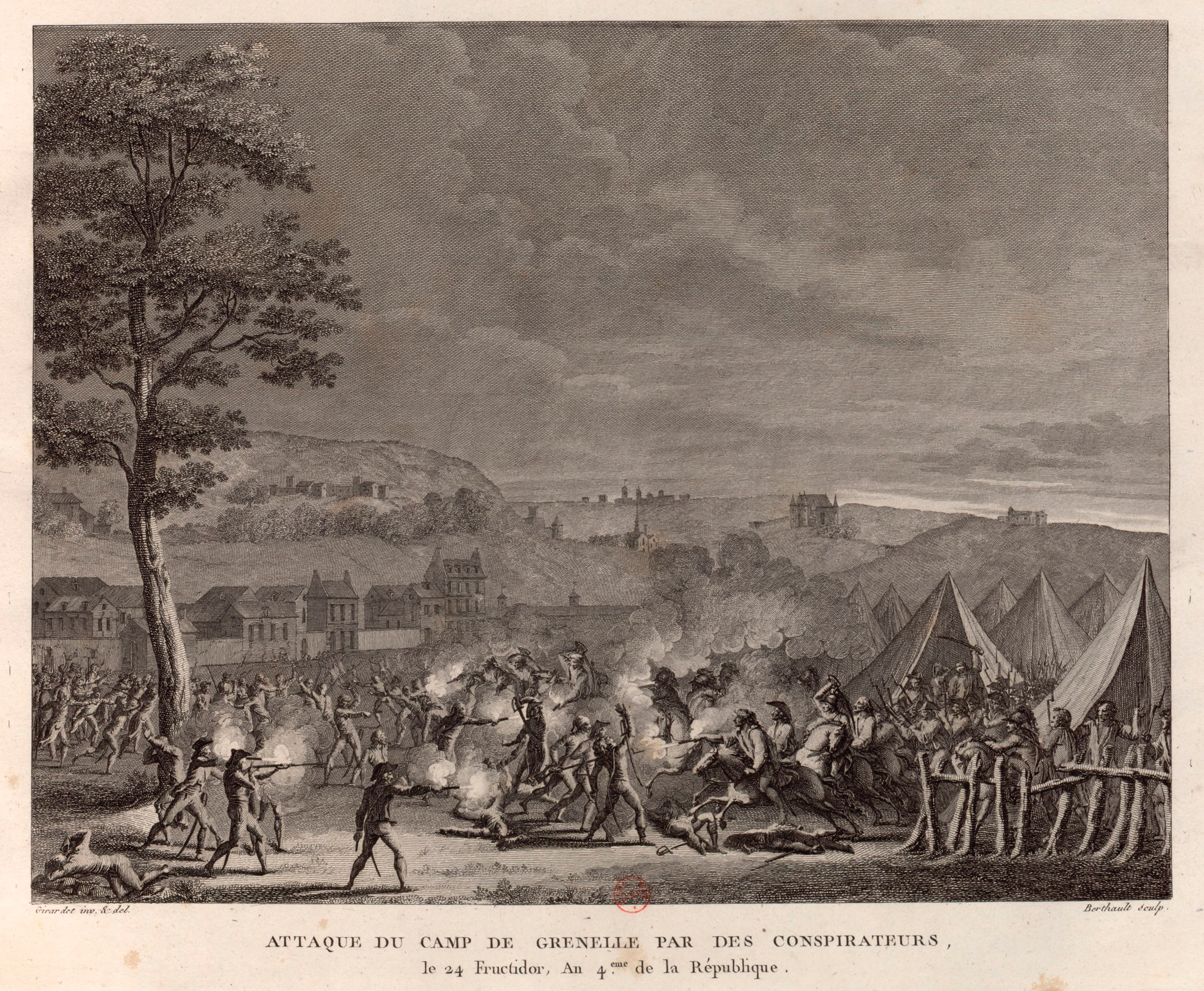
Attack by the followers of Babeuf on the army camp of Grenelle on 9 and 10 September 1796. Drawing by Abraham Girardet, engraving by Pierre-Gabriel Berthault, 1802. (BNF, Département des Estampes)

In 1795, the Directory faced a new threat from the left, from the followers of François Noël Babeuf, a talented political agitator who took the name Gracchus and was the organizer of what became known as the Conspiracy of the Equals. Babeuf had, since 1789, been drawn to the Agrarian Law, an agrarian reform preconized by the ancient Roman brothers, Tiberius and Gaius Gracchus, of sharing goods in common, as means of achieving economic equality. By the time of the fall of Robespierre, he had abandoned this as an impractical scheme and was moving towards a more complex plan. Babeuf did not call for the abolition of private property, and wrote that peasants should own their own plots of land, but he advocated that all wealth should be shared equally: all citizens who were able would be required to work, and all would receive the same income. Babeuf did not believe that the mass of French citizens was ready for self-government; accordingly, he proposed a dictatorship under his leadership until the people were educated enough to take charge. "People!", Babeuf wrote. "Breathe, see, recognize your guide, your defender.... Your tribune presents himself with confidence."

At first, Babeuf's following was small; the readers of his newspaper, Le Tribun du peuple ("The Tribune of the People"), were mostly middle-class far-left Jacobins who had been excluded from the new government. However, his popularity increased in the working-class of the capital with the drop in value of the assignats, which rapidly resulted in the decrease of wages and the rise of food prices. Beginning in October 1795, he allied himself with the most radical Jacobins, and on 29 March 1796 formed the Directoire secret des Égaux ("Secret Directory of Equals"), which proposed to "revolutionize the people" through pamphlets and placards, and eventually to overthrow the government. He formed an alliance of utopian socialists and radical Jacobins, including Félix Lepeletier, Pierre-Antoine Antonelle, Sylvain Marechal, Jean-Pierre-André Amar and Jean-Baptiste Robert Lindet. The Conspiracy of Equals was organized in a novel way: in the center was Babeuf and the Secret Directory, who hid their identities, and shared information with other members of the Conspiracy only via trusted intermediaries. This conspiratorial structure was later adopted by Marxist movements. Despite his precautions, the Directory infiltrated an agent into the conspiracy, and was fully informed of what he was doing. Bonaparte, the newly named commander of the Army of the Interior, was ordered to close the Panthéon Club, the major meeting place for the Jacobins in Paris, which he did on 27 February 1796. The Directory took other measures to prevent an uprising; the Legion of Police (légion de police), a local police force dominated by Jacobins, was forced to become a part of the Army, and the Army organized a mobile column to patrol the neighborhoods and stop uprisings.

Before Babeuf and his conspiracy could strike, he was betrayed by a police spy and arrested in his hiding place on 10 May 1796. Though he was a talented agitator, he was a very poor conspirator; with him in his hiding place were the complete records of the conspiracy, with all of the names of the conspirators. Despite this setback, the conspiracy went ahead with the Grenelle camp affair. On the night of 9–10 September 1796, between 400 and 700 Jacobins went to the 21st Regiment of Dragoons (21e régiment de dragons) army camp at Grenelle and tried to incite an armed rebellion against the Directory. At the same time a column of militants was formed in the working-class neighborhoods of Paris to march on the Luxembourg Palace, headquarters of the Directory. Director Carnot had been informed the night before by the commander of the camp, and a unit of dragoons was ready. When the attack began at about ten o'clock, the dragoons appeared suddenly and charged. About twenty Jacobins were killed, and the others arrested. The column of militants, learning what had happened, disbanded in confusion. The widespread arrest of Babeuf's militants and Jacobins followed. The practice of arresting suspects at their homes at night, stopped after the downfall of Robespierre, was resumed on this occasion.

Despite his arrest, Babeuf, in jail, still felt he could negotiate with the government. He wrote to the Directory: "Citizen Directors, why don't you look above yourselves and treat with me as with an equal power? You have seen now the vast confidence of which I am the center... this view makes you tremble." Several attempts were made by Babeuf's followers to free him from prison. He was finally moved to Vendôme for trial. The Directory did not tremble. The accused Jacobins were tried by military courts between 19 September and 27 October. Thirty Jacobins, including three former deputies of the Convention, were convicted and guillotined. Babeuf and his principal followers were tried in Vendôme between 20 February and 26 May 1797. The two principal leaders, Babeuf and Augustin Alexandre Darthé, were convicted. They both attempted suicide, but survived and were guillotined on 27 May 1797. However, in the following months, the Directory and Councils gradually turned away from the royalist right and tried to find new allies on the left.

=== War and Diplomacy (1796–1797) ===
The major preoccupation of the Directory during its existence was the war against the coalition of Britain and Austria. The military objective set by the Convention in October 1795 was to enlarge France to what were declared its natural limits: the Pyrenees, the Rhine and the Alps, the borders of Gaul at the time of the Roman Empire. In 1795, Prussia, Spain and the Dutch Republic quit the War of the First Coalition and made peace with France, but Great Britain refused to accept the French annexation of the Austrian Netherlands. Beside Britain and Austria, the only enemies remaining for France were the Kingdom of Sardinia and several small Italian states. Austria proposed a European congress to settle borders, but the Directory refused, demanding direct negotiations with Austria instead. Under British pressure, Austria agreed to continue the war against France.

Lazare Carnot, the Director who oversaw military affairs, planned a new campaign against Austria, using three armies: General Jean-Baptiste Jourdan's Army of Sambre-et-Meuse on the Rhine and General Jean Victor Moreau's Army of the Rhine and Moselle on the Danube would march to Vienna and dictate a peace. A third army, the Army of Italy under General Bonaparte, who had risen in rank with spectacular speed due to his defense of the government from a royalist uprising, would carry out a diversionary operation against Austria in northern Italy. Jourdan's army captured Mayence and Frankfurt, but on 14 August 1796 was defeated by the Austrians at the Battle of Amberg and again on 3 September 1796 at the Battle of Würzburg, and had to retreat back to the Rhine. General Moreau, without the support of Jourdan, was also forced to retreat.

==== Italian campaign ====
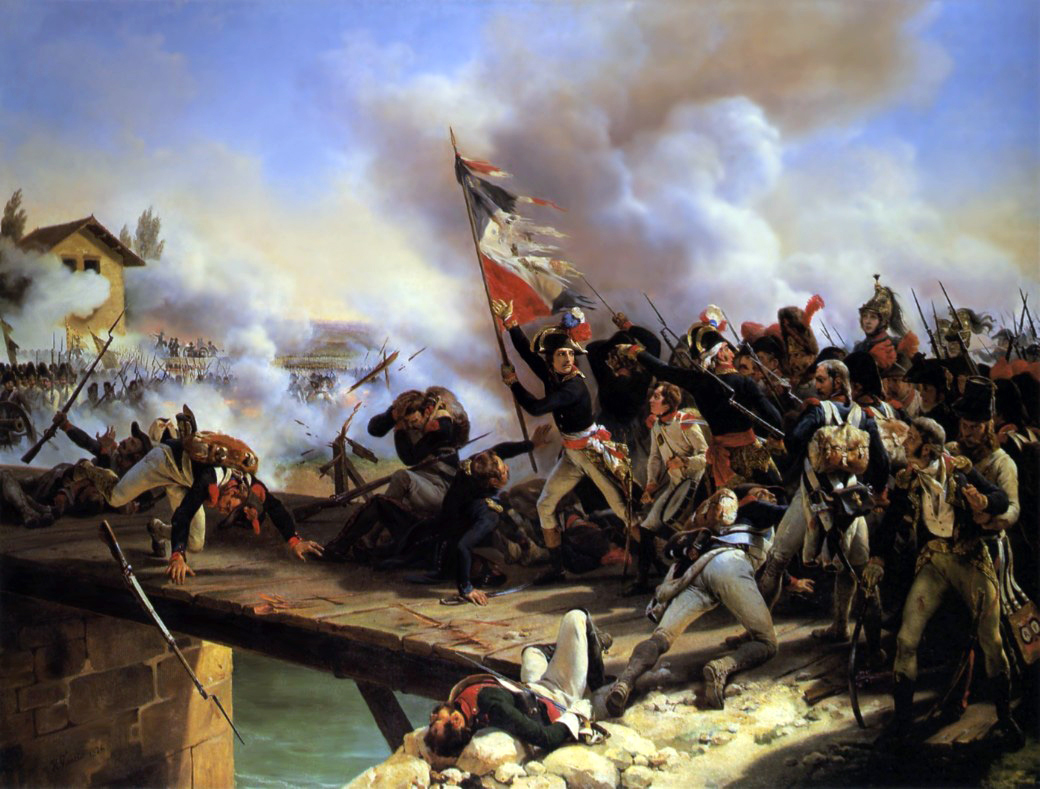
The Crossing of the Arcole Bridge by Horace Vernet, 1826. Bonaparte won his first major victory leading his soldiers across a bridge at the Battle of Arcole (17 November 1796)

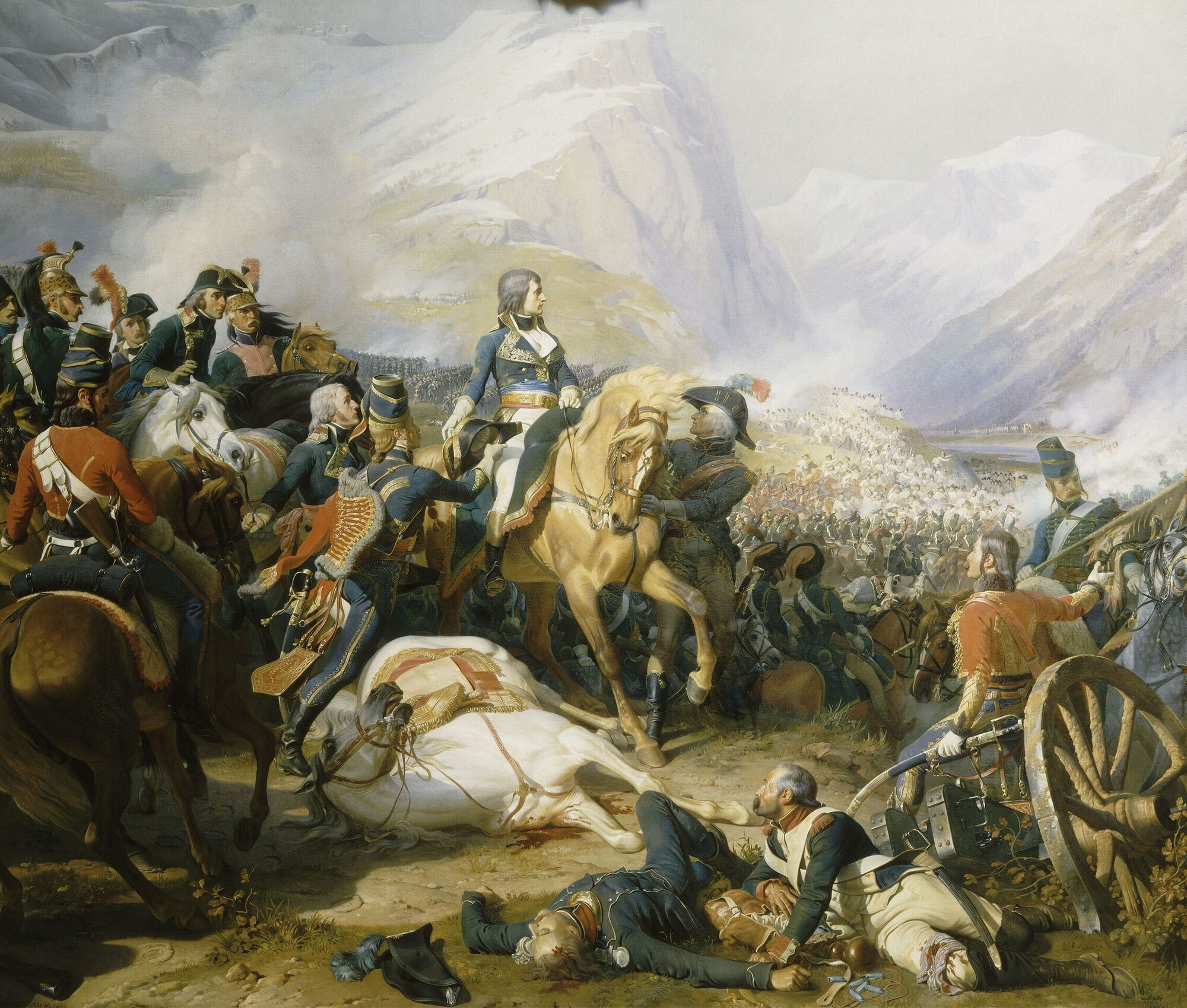
The Battle of Rivoli by Philippoteaux, 1844. Bonaparte defeats the Austrians at the Battle of Rivoli (14 January 1797)

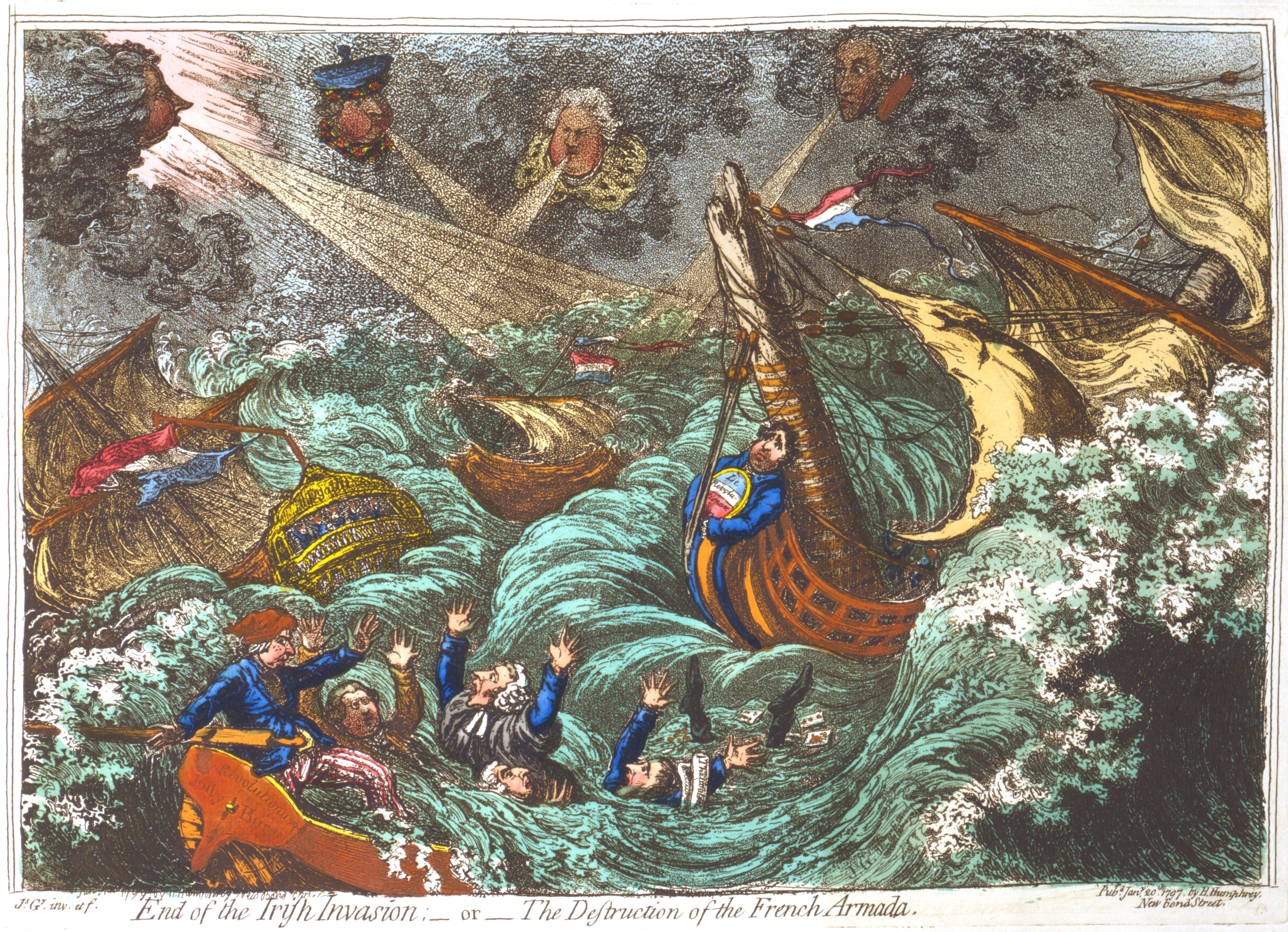
A British cartoon showed the failure of the French military expedition to Ireland dispersed by storms at sea in 1797

The story was very different in Italy. Bonaparte, though he was only twenty-eight years old, was named commander of the Army of Italy on 2 March 1796, through the influence of Barras, his patron in the Directory. Bonaparte faced the combined armies of Austria and Sardinia, which numbered seventy thousand men. Bonaparte slipped his army between them and defeated them in a series of battles, culminating at the Battle of Mondovi where he defeated the Sardinians on 22 April 1796, and the Battle of Lodi, where he defeated the Austrians on 10 May. King Victor Amadeus III of Sardinia was forced to make peace in May 1796 and ceded Nice and Savoy to France.

At the end of 1796, Austria sent two new armies to Italy to expel Bonaparte, but Bonaparte outmaneuvered them both, winning a first victory at the Battle of Arcole on 17 November 1796, then at the Battle of Rivoli on 14 January 1797. He forced Austria to sign the Treaty of Campo Formio (October 1797), whereby Emperor Francis II ceded Lombardy and the Austrian Netherlands to the French Republic in exchange for Venice and urged the Imperial Diet to surrender the lands beyond the Rhine.

==== Spanish alliance ====
The Directory was eager to form a coalition with Spain to block British commerce with the continent and to close the Mediterranean Sea to British ships. By the Second Treaty of San Ildefonso, concluded in August 1796, Spain became the ally of France, and on 5 October, it declared war on Britain. The British fleet under Admiral Jervis defeated the Spanish fleet at the Cape St Vincent, keeping the Mediterranean open to British ships, but Britain was brought into such extreme peril by the Spithead and Nore mutinies in its fleet that it offered to acknowledge the French conquest of the Netherlands and to restore captured French colonies in the Caribbean and India.

==== Irish Misadventure ====
The Directory also sought a new way to strike British interests and to repay Britain for the support it gave to royalist insurgents in Brittany. A French fleet of 44 vessels departed Brest on 15 December 1796, carrying an expeditionary force of 14,000 soldiers, led by General Hoche to Ireland, where they hoped to join forces with Irish rebels to expel the British from the Kingdom of Ireland. However, the fleet was separated by storms off the Irish coast and, being unable to land in Ireland, had to return to home port with 31 vessels and 12,000 surviving soldiers.

=== Rise of the royalists and coup d'état (1797) ===
The first elections held after the formation of the Directory were held in March and April 1797, in order to replace one-third of the members of the Councils. The elections were a crushing defeat for the old members of the Convention; 205 of the 216 were defeated. Only eleven former deputies from the Convention were reelected, several of whom were royalists. The elections were a triumph for the royalists, particularly in the south and in the west; after the elections there were about 160 royalist deputies, divided between those who favored a return to an absolute monarchy, and those who wished a constitutional monarchy on the British model. The constitutional monarchists elected to the Council included Pierre Samuel du Pont de Nemours, who later emigrated to the United States with his family, and whose son, Éleuthère Irénée du Pont, founded the "E. I. du Pont de Nemours and Company", now known as DuPont. In Paris and other large cities, the candidates of the left dominated. General Jean-Charles Pichegru, a former Jacobin and ordinary soldier who had become one of the most successful generals of the Revolution, was elected president of the new Council of Five Hundred. François Barbé-Marbois, a diplomat and future negotiator of the sale of Louisiana to the United States, was elected president of the Council of Ancients.

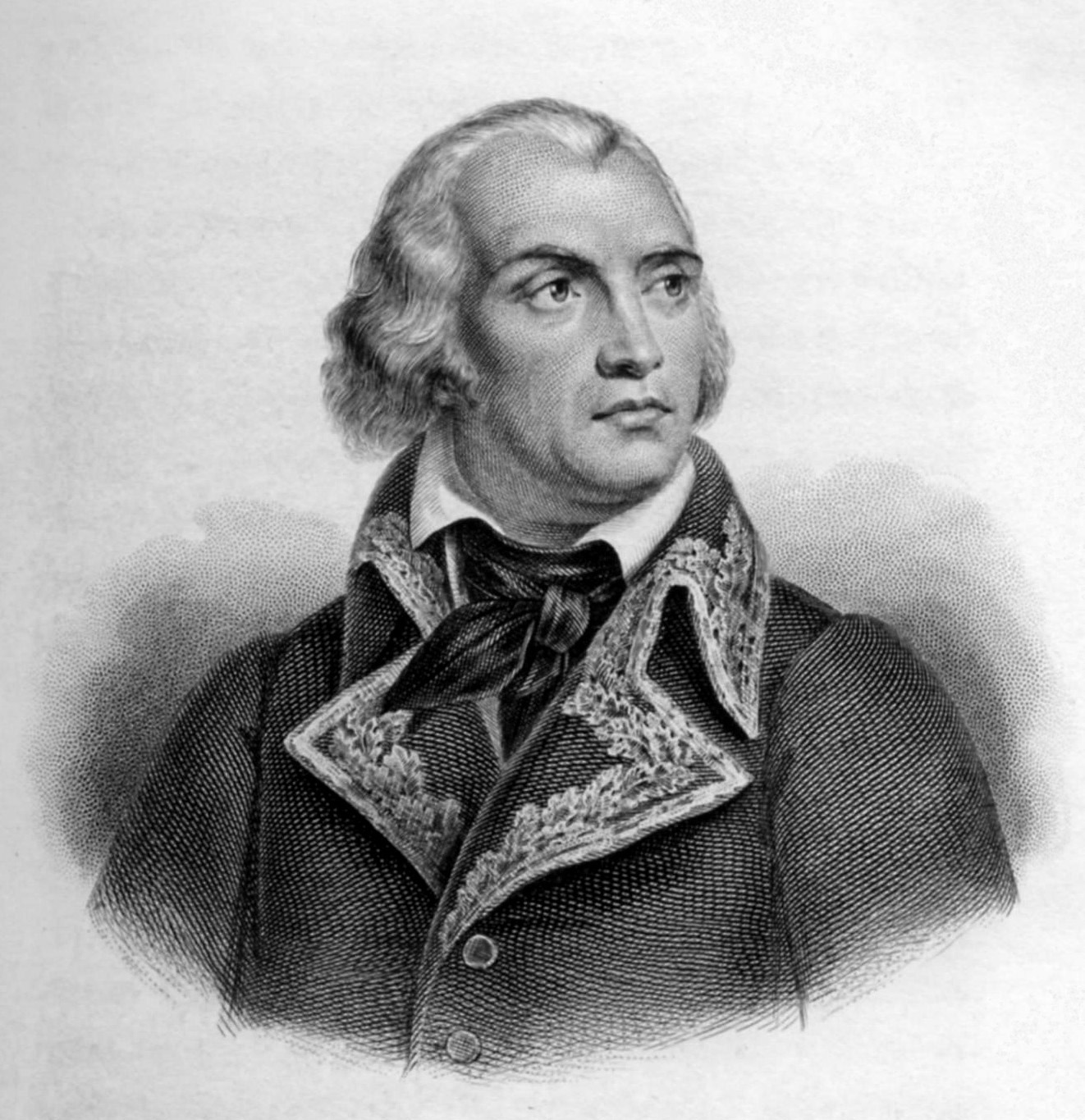
General Jean-Charles Pichegru, president of the Council of Five Hundred, was accused of being a secret royalist

Royalism was not strictly legal, and deputies could not announce themselves as such, but royalist newspapers and pamphlets soon appeared, there were pro-monarchy demonstrations in theaters, and royalists wore identifying clothing items, such as black velvet collars, in show of mourning for the execution of Louis XVI. The parliamentary royalists demanded changes in the government fiscal policies, and a more tolerant position toward religion. During the Convention, churches had been closed and priests required to take an oath to the government. Priests who had refused to take the oath were expelled from the country, on pain of the death penalty if they returned. Under the Directory, many priests had quietly returned, and many churches around the country had re-opened and were discreetly holding services. When the Directory proposed moving the ashes of the celebrated mathematician and philosopher René Descartes to the Panthéon, one deputy, Louis-Sébastien Mercier, a former Girondin and opponent of the Jacobins, protested that the ideas of Descartes had inspired the Reign of Terror of the Revolution and destroyed religion in France. Descartes's ashes were not moved. Émigrés who had left during the Revolution had been threatened by the Convention with the death penalty if they returned; now, under the Directory, they quietly began to return.

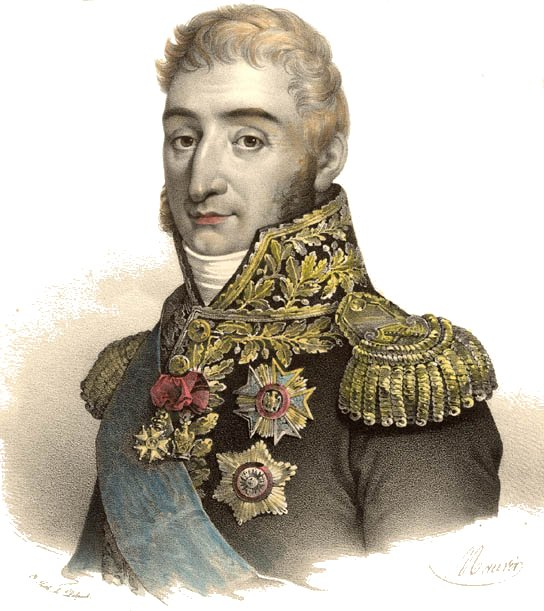
General Pierre Augereau, a close ally of Bonaparte, led the army that arrested the royalist leaders of the legislature (4 September 1797)

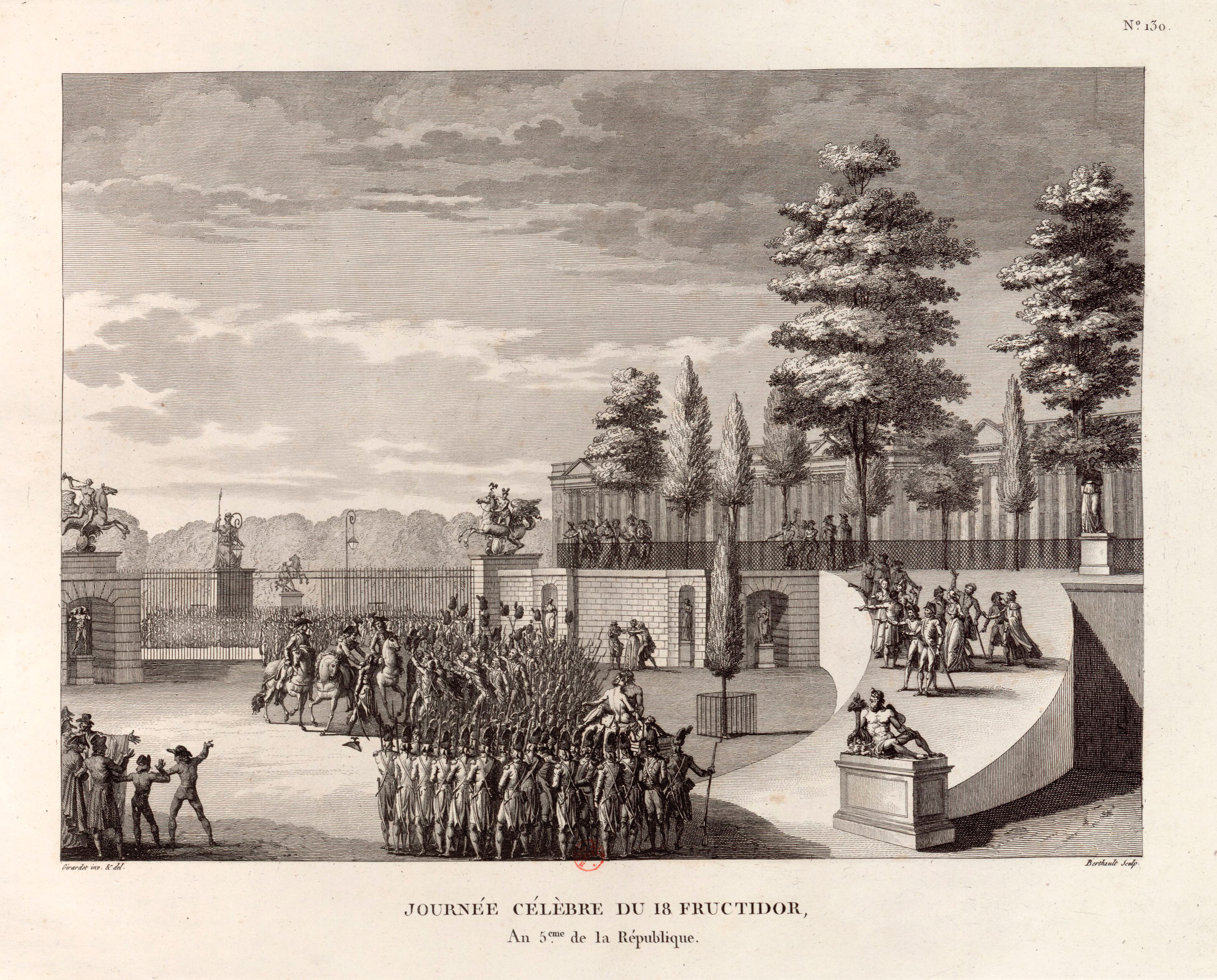
The army arrests General Pichegru at the Tuileries Palace (4 September 1797)

Parallel with the parliamentary royalists, but not directly connected with them, a clandestine network of royalists existed, whose objective was to place Louis XVIII, then in exile in Germany, on the French throne. They were funded largely by Britain, through the offices of William Wickham, the British spymaster who had his headquarters in Switzerland. These networks were too divided and too closely watched by the police to have much effect on politics. However, Wickham did make one contact that proved to have a decisive effect on French politics: through an intermediary, he had held negotiations with General Pichegru, then commander of the Army of the Rhine.

The Directory itself was divided. Carnot, Letourneur and La Révellière Lépeaux were not royalists, but favored a more moderate government, more tolerant of religion. Though Carnot himself had been a member of the Committee of Public Safety, he declared that the Jacobins were ungovernable, that the Revolution could not go on forever, and that it was time to end it. A new member, François-Marie, marquis de Barthélemy, a diplomat, had joined the Directory; he was allied with Carnot. The royalists in the Councils immediately began to demand more power over the government and particularly over the finances, threatening the position of Barras.

Barras, the consummate intriguer, won La Révellière Lépeaux over to his side, and began planning the downfall of the royalists. From letters taken from a captured royalist agent, he was aware of the contacts that General Pichegru made with the British and that he had been in contact with the exiled Louis XVIII. He presented this information to Carnot, and Carnot agreed to support his action against the Councils. General Hoche, the new Minister of War, was directed to march the Army of Sambre-et-Meuse through Paris on its way to Brest, on the pretext that they would be embarked for a new expedition to Ireland. Hoche himself resigned as Minister of War on 22 July. General Pierre Augereau, a close subordinate and ally of Bonaparte, and his troops arrived in Paris on 7 August, though it was a violation of the Constitution for soldiers to be within twelve leagues of the city without permission of the Councils. The royalist members of the Councils protested, but could do nothing to send them away.

On 4 September 1797, with the army in place, the Coup d'état of 18 Fructidor, Year V was set in motion. General Augereau's soldiers arrested Pichegru, Barthélemy, and the leading royalist deputies of the Councils. The next day, the Directory annulled the elections of about two hundred deputies in 53 departments. Sixty-five deputies were deported to Guiana, 42 royalist newspapers were closed, and 65 journalists and editors were deported. Carnot and Barthélemy were removed from the Directory. Carnot went into exile in Switzerland; he later returned and became, for a time, Bonaparte's minister of war. Barthélemy and Pichegru both were sent to exile in French Guiana (Devil's Island). In June 1798, they both escaped, and went first to the United States and then to England. During the Consulate, Pichegru returned secretly to Paris, where he was captured on 28 February 1804. He died in prison on 6 April 1804, either strangled or having committed suicide.

=== Second Directory and resurgence of the Jacobins ===
The coup was followed by a scattering of uprisings by royalists in Aix-en-Provence, Tarascon and other towns, particularly in the southwest and west. A commissioner of the Directory was assassinated in Lyon, and on 22 October counter-revolutionaries seized the city government of Carpentras for twenty-four hours. These brief uprisings served only to justify a wave of repression from the new government.

With Carnot and Barthélemy gone from the Directory, and the royalists expelled from the Councils, the Jacobins were once again in control of the government. The two vacant places in the Directory were filled by Merlin de Douai, a lawyer who had helped write the Law of Suspects during the Reign of Terror; and François de Neufchâteau, a poet and expert in industry inland navigation, who served only a few months. Eight of the twelve Directors and ministers of the new government were regicides, who as deputies of the Convention had voted for the execution of Louis XVI, and were now determined to continue the Revolution.

The central administration and city governments were quickly purged of suspected royalists. The next target was the wave of noble émigrés and priests who had begun to return to France. The Jacobins in the Councils demanded that the law of 1793 be enforced; émigrés were ordered to leave France within fifteen days. If they did not, they were to be judged by a military commission, and, on simple proof of their identity, were to be executed within twenty-four hours. Military commissions were established throughout the country to judge not only returning émigrés, but also rebels and conspirators. Between 4 September 1797 and the end of the Directory in 1799, 160 persons were condemned to death by the military tribunals, including 41 priests and several women.

On 16 October 1797, the Council of Five Hundred considered a new law which banned political activities by nobles, who were to be considered as foreigners, and had to apply for naturalization in order to take part in politics. A certain number, listed by names, were to be banned permanently from political activity, were to have their property confiscated, and were to be required to leave immediately. The law called for certain exemptions for those in the government and military (Director Barras and General Bonaparte were both from minor noble families). In the end, resistance to the law was so great that it was not adopted.

The Jacobin-dominated councils also demanded the deportation of priests who refused to take an oath to the government, and an oath declaring their hatred of royalty and anarchy. 267 priests were deported to the French penal colony of Cayenne in French Guiana, of whom 111 survived and returned to France. 920 were sent to a prison colony on the Île de Ré, and 120, a large part of them Belgians, to another colony on the Île d'Oléron. The new government continued the anti-religious policy of the Convention. Several churches, including the cathedral Notre Dame de Paris and the church of Saint-Sulpice, were converted into Theophilanthropic temples, a new religion based on the belief in the existence of God and the immortality of the human spirit. Religious observations were forbidden on Sunday; they were allowed only on the last day of the 10-day week (décade) of the French Republican Calendar. Other churches remained closed, and were forbidden to ring their bells, although many religious services took place in secret in private homes. The National Guard was mobilized to search rural areas and forests for priests and nobles in hiding. As during the Reign of Terror, lists were prepared of suspects, who would be arrested in the event of attempted uprisings.

The new Jacobin-dominated Directory and government also targeted the press. Newspaper publishers were required to submit copies of their publications to the police for official approval. On 17 December 1797, seventeen Paris newspapers were closed by order of the Directory. The Directory also imposed a substantial tax on all newspapers or magazines distributed by mail, although Jacobin publications, as well as scientific and art publications, were excluded. Books critical of the Jacobins were censored; Louis-Marie Prudhomme's six-volume Histoire générale et impartiale des erreurs, des fautes et des crimes commis pendant la Révolution française ("General and impartial history of the errors, faults and crimes committed during the French Revolution") was seized by the police. The Directory also authorized the opening and reading of letters coming from outside of France.

Despite all these security measures, there was a great increase in brigandage and robbery in the French countryside; travelers were frequently stopped on roads and robbed; the robberies were often blamed on royalist bands. On 18 January 1798, the Councils passed a new law against highwaymen and bandits, calling for them to be tried by military tribunals, and authorizing the death penalty for robbery or attempted robbery on the roads of France.

The political repression and terror under the Directory were real, but they were on a much smaller scale than the Reign of Terror under Robespierre and the Convention, and the numbers of those repressed declined during the course of the Directory. After 1798, no further political prisoners were sent to French Guiana, and, in the final year of the Directory, only one person was executed for a political offense.

=== Elections of 1798 ===
In the spring of 1798, not only a new third of the legislature had to be chosen, but the places of the members expelled by the revolution of Fructidor had to be filled. 437 seats were open, out of 750. The elections took place between 9 and 18 April. The royalists had been disqualified, and the moderates were in disarray, while the radical Jacobins made a strong showing. Before the new deputies could take their seats, Barras and the other Directors, more moderate than the new Jacobins, organized a commission to review the elections, and disqualified many of the more extreme Jacobin candidates (Law of 22 Floréal Year VI), replacing them with moderates. They sent the list of candidates for Director to the Councils, excluding any radicals. François de Neufchåteau was chosen by a drawing of lots to leave the Directory and Barras proposed only moderate Jacobins to replace him: the choice fell on Jean-Baptiste Treilhard, a lawyer. These political maneuvers secured the power of the Directory, but widened further the gap between the moderate Directory and the radical Jacobin majority in the Councils.

=== War and diplomacy (1798) ===
On 17 October 1797, General Bonaparte and the Austrians signed the Treaty of Campoformio. It was a triumph for France. France received the left bank of the Rhine as far south as Andernach, Belgium, and the Ionian Islands that had belonged to the Republic of Venice. Austria in compensation was given the Veneto and the former Venetian Dalmatia. In late November and December, Napoleon took part in negotiations with the Holy Roman Empire and Austria, at the Second Congress of Rastatt, to redraw the borders of Germany. He was then summoned back to Paris to take charge of an even more ambitious project, the invasion of Britain, which had been proposed by Director Carnot and General Hoche. But an eight-day inspection of the ports where the invasion fleet was being prepared convinced Bonaparte that the invasion had little chance of success: the ships were in poor condition, the crews poorly trained, and funds and logistics were lacking. He privately told his associate Marmont his view of the Directory: "Nothing can be done with these people. They don't understand anything of greatness. We need to go back to our projects for the East. It is only there that great results can be achieved." The invasion of England was cancelled, and a less ambitious plan to support an Irish uprising was proposed instead (see below).

==== Sister Republics ====
The grand plan of the Directory in 1798, with the assistance of its armies, was the creation of "Sister Republics" in Europe which would share the same revolutionary values and same goals, and would be natural allies of France. In the Dutch Republic (Republic of the Seven United Netherlands), the French army installed the Batavian Republic with the same system of a Directory and two elected Councils. In Milan, the Cisalpine Republic was created, which was governed jointly by a Directory and Councils and by the French army. General Louis-Alexandre Berthier, who had replaced Bonaparte as the commander of the Army of Italy, imitated the actions of the Directory in Paris, purging the new republic's legislature of members whom he considered too radical. The Ligurian Republic was formed in Genoa. Piedmont was also turned by the French army into a sister republic, the Piedmontese Republic. In Turin, King Charles-Emmanuel IV, (whose wife, Clotilde, was Louis XVI's youngest sister), fled French dominance and sailed, protected by the British fleet, to Sardinia. In Savoy, General Barthélemy Catherine Joubert did not bother to form a sister republic, he simply made the province a department of France.

The Directory also directly attacked the authority of Pope Pius VI, who governed Rome and the Papal States surrounding it. Shortly after Christmas on 28 December 1797, anti-French riots took place in Rome, and a French Army brigadier general, Mathurin-Léonard Duphot, was assassinated. Pope Pius VI moved quickly and formally apologized to the Directory on 29 December 1797, but the Directory refused his apology. Instead, Berthier's troops entered Rome and occupied the city on 10 February 1798. Thus the Roman Republic was also proclaimed on 10 February 1798. Pius VI was arrested and confined in the Grand Duchy of Tuscany before being taken to France in 1799. The Vatican treasury of thirty million francs was sent to Paris, where it helped finance Bonaparte's expedition to Egypt, and five hundred cases of paintings, statues, and other art objects were sent to France and added to the collections of the Louvre.

A French army under General Guillaume Brune occupied much of Switzerland. The Helvetic Republic was proclaimed on 12 April 1798. On 26 August 1798, Geneva was detached from the new republic and made part of France. The treasury of Bern was seized, and, like the treasury of the Vatican, was used to finance Bonaparte's expedition to Egypt.

The new military campaigns required thousands of additional soldiers. The Directory approved the first permanent law of conscription, which was unpopular in the countryside, and particularly in Belgium, which had formally become part of France. Riots and peasant uprisings took place in the Belgian countryside. Blaming the unrest on Belgian priests, French authorities ordered the arrest and deportation of several thousands of them.

==== Bonaparte's expedition to Egypt (May 1798) ====
The idea of a French military expedition to Egypt had been proposed by Charles Maurice de Talleyrand-Périgord in a memoir to the Institut de France as early as 3 July 1797, and in a letter the following month from Talleyrand to Bonaparte. The Egyptian expedition had three objectives: to cut the shortest route from England to British India by occupying the Isthmus of Suez; to found a colony which could produce cotton and sugar cane, which were in short supply in France due to the British blockade; and to provide a base for a future French attack on British India. It also had several personal advantages for Bonaparte: it allowed him to keep a distance from the unpopular Directory, while at the same time staying in the public eye.

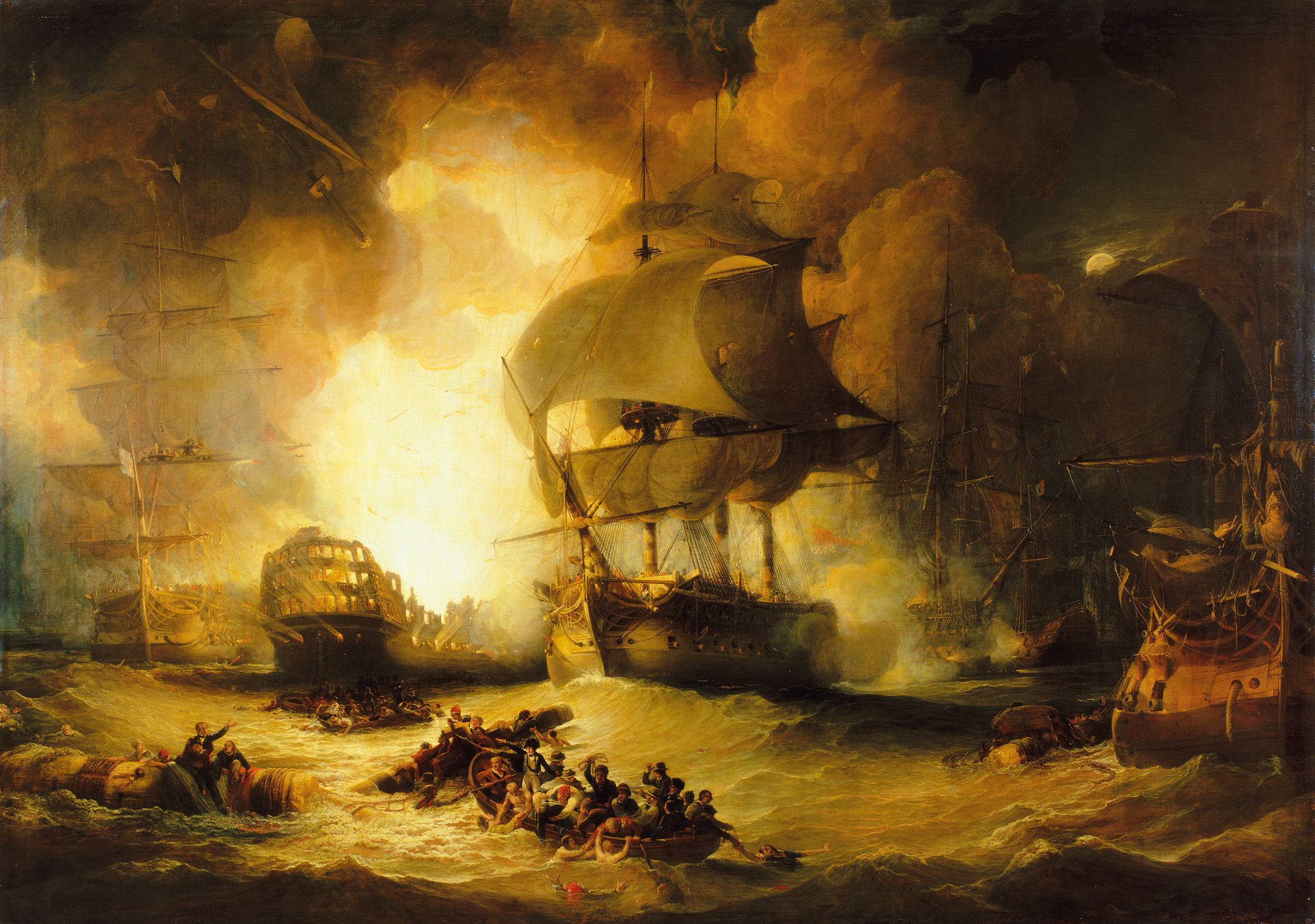
The Destruction of 'L'Orient' at the Battle of the Nile, 1 August 1798, oil on canvas by George Arnald (1825-1827). Defeat at the Battle of the Nile left Bonaparte and his army stranded in Egypt. National Maritime Museum, Greenwich, England

The Directory itself was not enthusiastic about the idea, which would take its most successful general and his army far from Europe just at the time that a major new war was brewing. Director La Révellière-Lépeaux wrote: "The idea never came from the Directory or any of its members. The ambition and pride of Bonaparte could no longer support the idea of not being visible, and of being under the orders of the Directory."

The idea presented two other problems: Republican French policy was opposed to colonization, and France was not at war with the Ottoman Empire, to which Egypt belonged. Therefore, the expedition was given an additional scientific purpose: "to enlighten the world and to obtain new treasures for science." A large team of prominent scientists was added to the expedition; twenty-one mathematicians, three astronomers, four architects, thirteen naturalists and an equal number of geographers, plus painters, a pianist and the poet François-Auguste Parseval-Grandmaison.

On 19 May 1798, two hundred ships carrying Bonaparte, and 35,000 men comprising the Armée d'Orient, most of them veterans of Bonaparte's Army of Italy, sailed from Toulon. The British fleet under Nelson, expecting a French expedition toward Constantinople, was not in position to stop them. The French fleet stopped briefly at Malta, capturing the island, the government of which offered little resistance. Bonaparte's army landed in the bay of Alexandria on 1 July, and captured that city on 2 July, with little opposition. He wrote a letter to the Pasha of Egypt, claiming that his purpose was to liberate Egypt from the tyranny of the Mamluks. His army marched across the desert, despite extreme heat, and defeated the Mamluks at the Battle of the Pyramids on 21 July 1798. A few days later, however, on 1 August, the British fleet under Admiral Nelson arrived off the coast; the French fleet was taken by surprise and destroyed in the Battle of the Nile. Only four French ships escaped. Bonaparte and his army were prisoners in Egypt.

==== Failed uprising in Ireland (August 1798) ====
Another attempt to support an Irish uprising was made on 7 August 1798. A French fleet sailed from Rochefort-sur-Mer (Rochefort) carrying an expeditionary force led by General Jean Joseph Amable Humbert. The attack was intended to support an uprising of Irish nationalists led by Wolfe Tone. Tone had several meetings with Bonaparte in France to coordinate the timing, but the uprising within the Kingdom of Ireland began early and was suppressed on 14 July 1798 before the French fleet arrived. The French force landed at Killala, in northwest Ireland, on 22 August. It defeated British troops in two small engagements on 24 and 27 August, and Humbert declared the formation of an Irish Republic at Castlebar on 27 August, but the French forces were defeated at the Battle of Ballinamuck on 8 September 1798 by the troops of Lord Cornwallis, British Commander-in-Chief, Ireland. A second part of the French expeditionary force, not knowing that the first had surrendered, left Brest on 16 September. It was intercepted by the Royal Navy in the bay of Donegal, and six of the French warships were captured.

==== Quasi-War with the United States (1798–1799) ====
Tensions between the United States and France developed into the Quasi-War, an undeclared naval war. France complained the United States was ignoring the 1778 Treaty of Alliance that had brought the French into the American Revolutionary War. The United States insisted on taking a neutral stance in the war between France and Britain. After the Jay Treaty with Britain went into effect in 1795, France began to side against the United States and by 1797 had seized over 300 American merchant ships. Federalists favored Britain while Jeffersonian Republicans favored France. Federalist President John Adams built up the United States Navy, finishing three frigates, approving funds to build three more and sending diplomats to Paris to negotiate. They were insulted by Foreign Minister Talleyrand (who demanded bribes before talking). The XYZ Affair told Americans about the negotiations and angered American public opinion. The war was fought almost entirely at sea, mostly between privateers and merchant ships. In 1800, the Convention of 1800 (Treaty of Mortefontaine) ended the conflict.

=== War and political crisis (1799) ===
==== Second Coalition against France ====
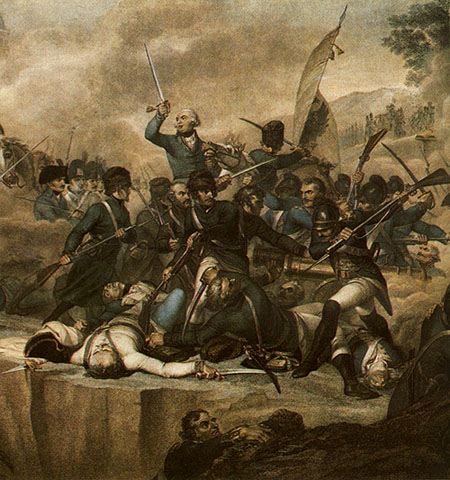
Suvorov and a Russian-Austrian army defeat the French at the Battle of Cassano on 27 April 1799 by Luigi Schiavonetti

Britain and Austria had been alarmed by the French creation of Sister Republics. Austria first demanded that France hand over a share of the territory of the new Republics to it. When the Directory refused, Austria began searching for partners for a new military alliance against France. The new Tsar of Russia, Paul I, was extremely hostile to French republican ideas, sympathetic to the exiled Louis XVIII, and willing to join a new coalition against France. The Tsar offered an army of 20,000 men, sent by sea to Holland on his Baltic fleet. He sent another army of 60,000 men, veterans of fighting in Poland and Turkey, under his best general, Alexander Suvorov, to join the Austrian forces in northern Italy.

The King of Prussia, Frederick-William III, had carefully preserved neutrality in order to profit from both sides. The Directory made the error of sending one of the most prominent revolutionaries of 1789, the Abbé Sieyés, who had voted for the death of Louis XVI, as ambassador to Berlin, where his ideas appalled the arch-conservative and ultra-monarchist king. Frederick William maintained his neutrality, refusing to support either side, a setback for France.

By the end of 1798, the coalition could count on 300,000 soldiers, and would be able to increase the number to 600,000. The best French army, headed by Bonaparte, was stranded in Egypt. General Brune had 12,000 men in Holland; Bernadotte, 10,000 men on the Rhine; Jourdan, 40,000 men in the army of the Danube; Masséna, 30,000 soldiers in Switzerland; Scherer, 40,000 men on the Adige river in northern Italy; and 27,000 men under Macdonald were based in Naples: a total of 170,000 men. To try to match the coalition forces, the Directory ordered a new call up of young men between the ages of twenty and twenty five to the army, seeking to add two hundred thousand new soldiers.

==== Resurgence of the War in Italy and Switzerland ====
On 10 November 1798, the British and Austrian governments had agreed on a common goal of suppressing the five new sister republics and forcing France back into its 1789 borders. Then on 29 November 1798, on the first day of the War of the Second Coalition, King Ferdinand of Naples launched an attack on Rome, which was lightly defended by French soldiers. A British fleet landed three thousand Neapolitan soldiers in Tuscany. However, the French army of General Championnet responded quickly, defeating the Neapolitan army at the Battle of Civita Castellana at Civita Castellana on 5 December. The next day, 6 December 1798, French soldiers also forced King Charles Emmanuel IV to remove his soldiers from Piedmont and to retreat to his island of Sardinia, his last possession. The French army marched to the Kingdom of Naples, obliging King Ferdinand to leave his City of Naples on a British warship on 23 December 1798. Naples was then occupied on 23 January 1799, and a new Neapolitan republic, the so-called Parthenopean Republic, the sixth under French protection, was proclaimed on 26 January.

Peace negotiations with Austria went nowhere in the spring of 1799, and the Directory decided to launch a new offensive into Germany, but the arrival of a Russian army under Alexander Suvorov and fresh Austrian forces under the Archduke Charles for a time changed the balance of power. Jourdan's Army of the Danube crossed the Rhine on 6 March but was defeated by the Archduke Charles, first at the Battle of Ostrach and then at the Battle of Stockach on 25 March 1799. Jourdan's army withdrew while Jourdan himself returned to Paris to plea for more soldiers.

The forces of the Second Coalition invaded French-occupied Italy, and after five earlier battles, a joint Russian-Austrian army under Suvorov's command defeated Moreau at the Battle of Cassano on 27 April 1799 and thus occupied Turin and Milan and thereby took back the Cisalpine Republic from France. Suvorov then defeated the French Army on the Terrivva. To redress the situation, Joubert was named the new head of the Army of Italy on 5 July, but his army suffered defeat by the Russians at the Battle of Novi, on 15 August; Joubert himself was shot through the heart when the battle began, and his army was routed. The Sister Republics established by the French in Italy quickly collapsed, leaving only Genoa under French control.

In August, the Russians and British opened a new front in the Netherlands. A British army was landed at Den Helder on 27 August, and was joined by a Russian army. On 31 August, the Batavian Navy, allied with France, surrendered to the Royal Navy. Seeing the French army and government in a crisis, the leaders of the royalist rebellions in the Vendée and Brittany came together on 15 September to prepare a renewed uprising.

The surviving leaders of the royalist rebellions in the Vendée and Brittany, which had long been dormant, saw a new opportunity for success and met to plan strategy on 15 September 1799. The royalist commander Louis de Frotté, in exile in England, returned to France to command the new uprising.

==== Bonaparte's Campaign in Syria (February–May 1799) ====
While the French armies in Italy and Switzerland tried to preserve the Sister Republics, Bonaparte pursued his own campaign in Egypt. He explained in a letter to the Directory that Egyptian venture was just the beginning of a broader campaign "to create a formidable diversion in the campaign of Republican France versus monarchic Europe. Egypt would be the base of something much larger than the original project, and at the same time a lever which will aid in the creation of a general uprising of the Muslim world." This uprising, he believed, would lead to the collapse of British power from the Middle East to India. With this goal in mind, he left Cairo and marched his army across the Sinai desert into Syria, where he laid siege to the port of Saint-Jean-d'Acre of the Ottoman Empire, which was defended by a local army and supplied by a British fleet offshore. His long siege and attempts to storm the city were a failure; his army was ravaged by disease, it was down to 11,000 men, and he learned that an Ottoman army was to be embarked by the British fleet to sail to Cairo to recapture the city. On 17 May, he abandoned the siege and was back in Cairo by 4 June. The British fleet landed the Ottoman army, but as soon as they were ashore they were decisively defeated by Bonaparte at the Battle of Abukir on 25 July 1799.

Due to the British blockade of Egypt, Bonaparte had received no news from France for six months. He sent one of his military aides to meet with Turkish government officials and to try to get news from France, but the officer was intercepted by the British navy. The British admiral and naval commander in the eastern Mediterranean, Sir Sidney Smith, who had lived in Paris and knew France well, gave the officer a packet of recent French newspapers and sent him back to Bonaparte. Bonaparte spent the night reading the newspapers, learning about the political and military troubles in France. His orders permitted him to return home any time he chose. The next day he decided to return to France immediately. He handed over command of the army to General Kléber and left Egypt with a small party of senior officers aboard the frigate Muiron. He escaped the British blockade but did not reach France until 9 October.

==== Tide turns: French successes (September 1799) ====
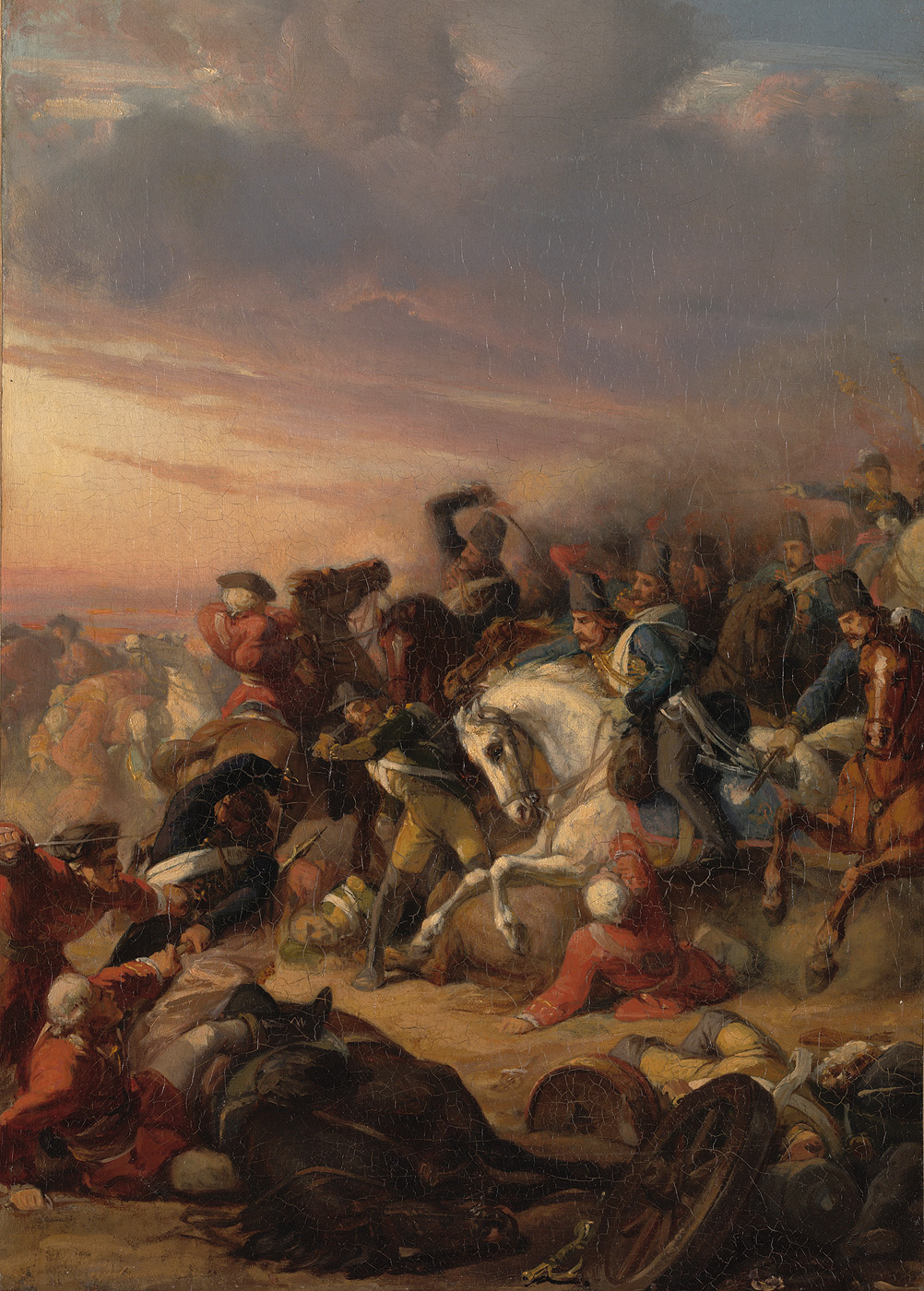
Franco-Batavian troops attacking Anglo-Russian forces at the Battle of Castricum, 6 October 1799, by Jan Antoon Neuhys, Amsterdam Museum, Netherlands

The military position of France, which seemed disastrous during the summer, improved greatly in September. On 19 September, General Brune won a victory over an Anglo-Russian army in the Netherlands at Castricum. On 18 October, besieged by Brune at Alkmaar, the Anglo-Russian forces under the Duke of York agreed to withdraw. In Switzerland, a Russian Army had split into two. On 25–26 September, the French army in Switzerland, led by André Masséna, defeated one part of the Russian army under Alexander Rimsky-Korsakov at the Second Battle of Zurich, and forced the rest of the Russian army, under Suvorov, into disastrous retreat across the Alps to 'Italy'. Suvorov was furious at the Austrians, blaming them for not supporting his troops, and he urged the Tsar to withdraw his forces from the war.

The royalist uprising in the west of France, planned to accompany the Anglo-Russian-Austrian offensive, was also a failure. The Chouans briefly seized Le Mans on 14 October and Nantes on 19 October, but they were quickly driven out by the French Army, and the rebellion had collapsed by 29 October.

=== New economic crisis ===
Since the beginning of the Revolution, the nation suffered from rampant inflation. By the time of the Directory, the paper money, the assignat, based on the value of goods confiscated from the church and nobility, had already lost most of its value. Prices had soared, and the government could not print money fast enough to meet its expenses. The value of the assignat had dropped drastically against the value of the livre, the main unit of currency of the old regime which contained silver. In 1790, at the beginning of the Revolution, an assignat with a face value of 1,000₶. could be exchanged for 900 silver livres. In January 1795, The Convention decided to issue assignats worth 30 billion-₶., without any additional backing by gold. By March 1795, an assignat with a value of 1,000₶. could buy only 80 silver livres. In February 1796, the Directory decided to abolish the assignat, and held a public ceremony to destroy the printing plates. The assignat was replaced by a new note, the Mandats territoriaux. But since this new paper money also lacked any substantial backing, its value also plummeted; by February 1797 the Mandat was worth only one percent of its original value. The Directory decided to return to the use of gold or silver coins, which kept their value. 100₶. of Mandats was exchanged for 1 silver livre. The difficulty was that the Directory had only enough gold and silver to produce 300 million-₶.. The result of the shortage of money in circulation was a drastic deflation and drop in prices, which was accompanied by a drop in investment, and a drop in wages. It led to a drop in economic activity, and unemployment.

=== New elections, new Directors and a growing political crisis ===
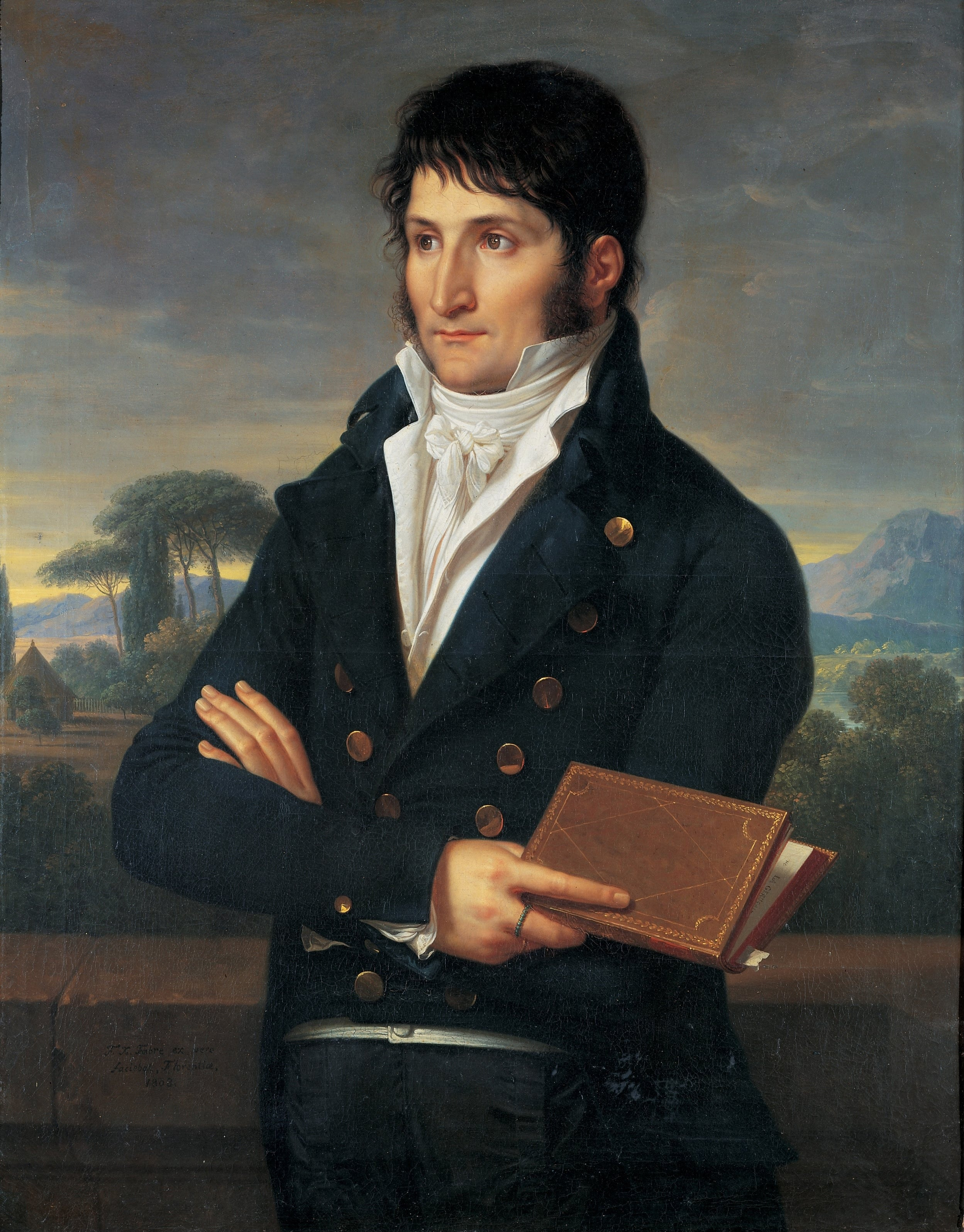
Lucien Bonaparte, 24-year-old brother of Napoléon, was elected President of the Council of Five Hundred. Lucien Bonaparte at the Villa Rufinella by Francois-Xavier Fabre, 1808, Museo Napoleonico, Rome

New elections to elect 315 members of the Councils were held between 21 March – 9 April 1799. The royalists had been discredited and were gone; the major winners were the neo-Jacobins, who wanted to continue and strengthen the Revolution. The new members of the Council included Lucien Bonaparte, the younger brother of Napoleon, just twenty-four years old. On the strength of his name, he was elected the President of the Council of Five Hundred.

This time the Directors did not try to disqualify the Jacobins but looked for other ways to keep control of the government. It was time to elect a new member of the Directory, as Rewbell had been designated by the drawing of lots to step down. Under the Constitution, the selection of a new member of the Directory was voted by the old members of the Councils, not the newly elected ones. The candidate selected to replace him was the Abbé Sieyés, one of the major leaders of the revolution in 1789, who had been serving as Ambassador to Berlin. Sieyés had his own project in mind: He had devised a new doctrine that the power of government should be limited in order to protect the rights of the citizens. His idea was to adopt a new Constitution with a supreme court, on the American model, to protect individual rights. He privately saw his primary mission as preventing a return of Reign of Terror of 1793, a new constitution, and bringing the Revolution to a close as soon as possible, by whatever means.

Once the elections were complete, the Jacobin majority immediately demanded that the Directory be made more revolutionary. The Councils began meeting on 20 May, and on 5 June they began their offensive to turn the Directors to the left. They declared the election of the Director Treilhard illegal on technical grounds and voted to replace him with Louis-Jérôme Gohier, a lawyer who had been Minister of Justice during the Convention, and who had overseen the arrest of the moderate Girondin deputies. The Jacobins in the Council then went a step further and demanded the resignation of two moderate Directors, La Revelliere and Merlin. They were replaced by two new members, Roger Ducos, a little-known lawyer who had been a member of the Committee of Public Safety, and was an ally of Barras, and an obscure Jacobin general, Jean-François-Auguste Moulin. The new Ministers named by the Directors were for the most part reliable Jacobins, though Sieyés arranged the appointment of one of his allies, Joseph Fouché, as the new Minister of Police.

The Jacobin members immediately began proposing laws that were largely favorable to the sans-culottes and working class, but which alarmed the upper and middle classes. The Councils imposed a forced loan of one hundred million francs, to be paid immediately according to a graduated scale by all who paid a property tax of over three hundred francs. Those who did not pay would be classified the same as émigré nobles and would lose all civil rights. The Councils also passed a new law that called for making hostages of the fathers, mothers and grandparents of émigré nobles whose children had emigrated or were serving in rebel bands or armies. These hostages were subject to large fines or deportation in the event of assassinations or property damage caused by royalist soldiers or bandits. On 27 June General Jourdan, a prominent Jacobin member of the Councils, proposed a mass draft of all eligible young men between twenty and twenty-five to raise two hundred thousand new soldiers for the army. This would be the first draft since 1793.

The new Jacobins opened a new political club, the Club du Manège, on the model of Jacobin clubs of the Convention. It opened on 6 July and soon had three thousand members, with 250 deputies, including many alumni of the Jacobins during the Reign of Terror, as well as former supporters of the ultra-revolutionary François Babeuf. One prominent member, General Jourdan, greeted the members at the club's banquet of 14 July with the toast, "to a return of the pikes'", referring to the weapons used by the sans-culottes to parade the heads of executed nobles. The club members also were not afraid to attack the Directory itself, complaining of its lavish furnishings and the luxurious coaches used by Directory members. The Directory soon responded to the provocations; Sieyés denounced the club members as a return of Robespierre's reign of terror. The Minister of Police, Fouché, closed the Club on 13 August.

=== Bonaparte returns to France, coup d'état and the end of the Directory ===
==== Preparing the coup d'état ====
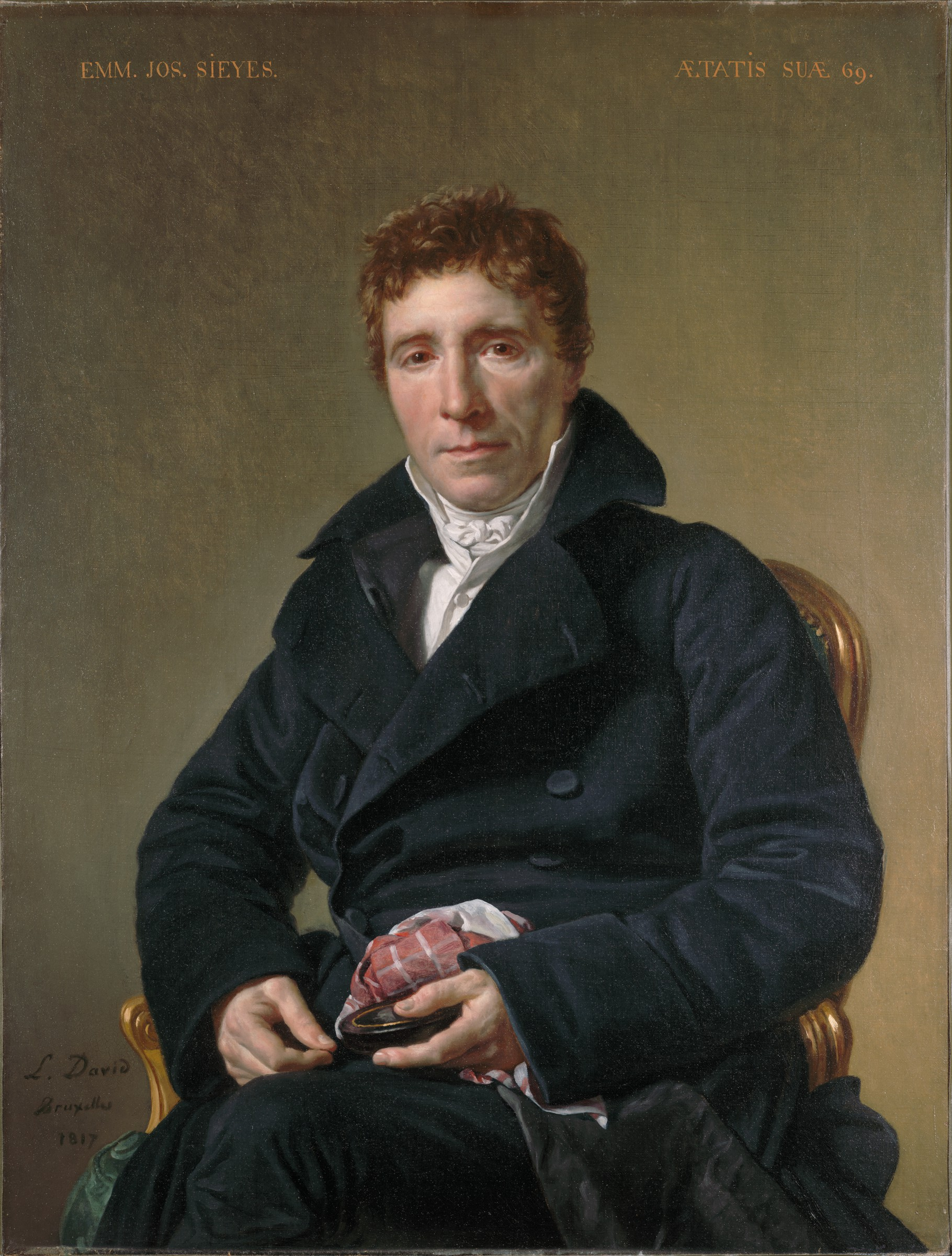
Emmanuel Joseph Sieyès first proposed the coup d'état, but he was left out of the final resulting government

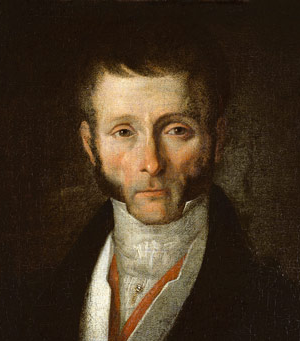
Joseph Fouché, Minister of Police, assured that the police would not interfere in Bonaparte's seizure of power

The rule that Directors must to be at least forty years old became one justification for the Coup of 18 Brumaire: the coup d'état took place on 9 November 1799, when Bonaparte was thirty years old. Bonaparte returned to France, landing at the fishing village of Saint-Raphaël on 9 October 1799, and made a triumphal progression northward to Paris. His victory over the Ottoman Turks at the Battle of Abukir had been widely reported, and overshadowed the other French victories at the Second Battle of Zurich and the Battle of Bergen. Between Avignon and Paris, he was welcomed by large, enthusiastic crowds, who saw him as a saviour of the Republic from foreign enemies and the corruption of the Directory. Upon his arrival in Paris he was elected to the Institut de France for the scientific accomplishments of his expedition to Egypt. He was welcomed by royalists because he was from a minor noble family in Corsica, and by the Jacobins because he had suppressed the attempted royalist coup d'état at the beginning of the Directory. His brother Lucien, though only twenty-four years old, became a prominent figure in the Council of Five Hundred because of his name.

Bonaparte's first ambition was to be appointed to the Directory, but he was not yet forty years old, the minimum age set by the Constitution, and the Director Gohier, a strict legalist, blocked that avenue. His earliest ally had been the Director Barras, but he disliked Barras because his wife Joséphine had been his mistress before she married Bonaparte, and because of charges of corruption that surrounded Barras and his allies. Bonaparte wrote later that the Jacobin director, General Jean-François-Auguste Moulin, approached Bonaparte and suggested that he lead a coup d'état, but he declined; he wished to end the Revolution, not continue it. Sieyés, who had been looking for a war hero and general to assist in a coup d'état, had originally in mind General Joubert, but Joubert had been killed at the Battle of Novi in August 1799. He then approached General Jean Victor Marie Moreau, but Moreau was not interested. The first meeting between Sieyés and Bonaparte, on 23 October 1799, went badly; the two men each had enormous egos and instantly disliked each other. Nonetheless, they had a strong common interest and, on 6 November 1799, they formalized their plan.

The coup d'état was carefully planned by Sieyès and Bonaparte, with the assistance of Bonaparte's brother Lucien, the diplomat and consummate intriguer Talleyrand, the Minister of Police Fouché, and the Commissioner of the Directory, Pierre François Réal. The plan called for three Directors to suddenly resign, leaving the country without an Executive. The Councils would then be told that a Jacobin conspiracy threatened the Nation; the Councils would be moved for their own security to the Château de Saint-Cloud, some 5 kilometres (3.1 mi) west of Paris, safe from the mobs of the French capital. Bonaparte would be named head of government to defend the Republic against the conspiracy; the Councils would be dissolved, and a new Constitution would be written. If the coup went well, it was simply a parliamentary maneuver; it would be perfectly legal. Bonaparte would provide security and take the part of convincing the Deputies. Fouché and Réal would assure that there would be no interference from the police or the city of Paris. Fouché proposed that the leading Jacobin deputies be arrested at the start of the coup, but Bonaparte said it would not be necessary, which later proved to be an error. Shortly before the coup, Bonaparte met with the principal army commanders: Jourdan, Bernadotte, Augereau and Moreau, and informed them of the impending coup. They did not all support it, but agreed not to stand in his way. The president of the Council of Ancients was also brought into the coup, so he could play his part, and Bonaparte's brother Lucien would manage the Council of Five Hundred. On the evening of 6 November, the Councils held a banquet at the former church of Saint-Sulpice. Bonaparte attended, but seemed cold and distracted, and departed early.

==== Coup d'état is launched (9–10 November) ====
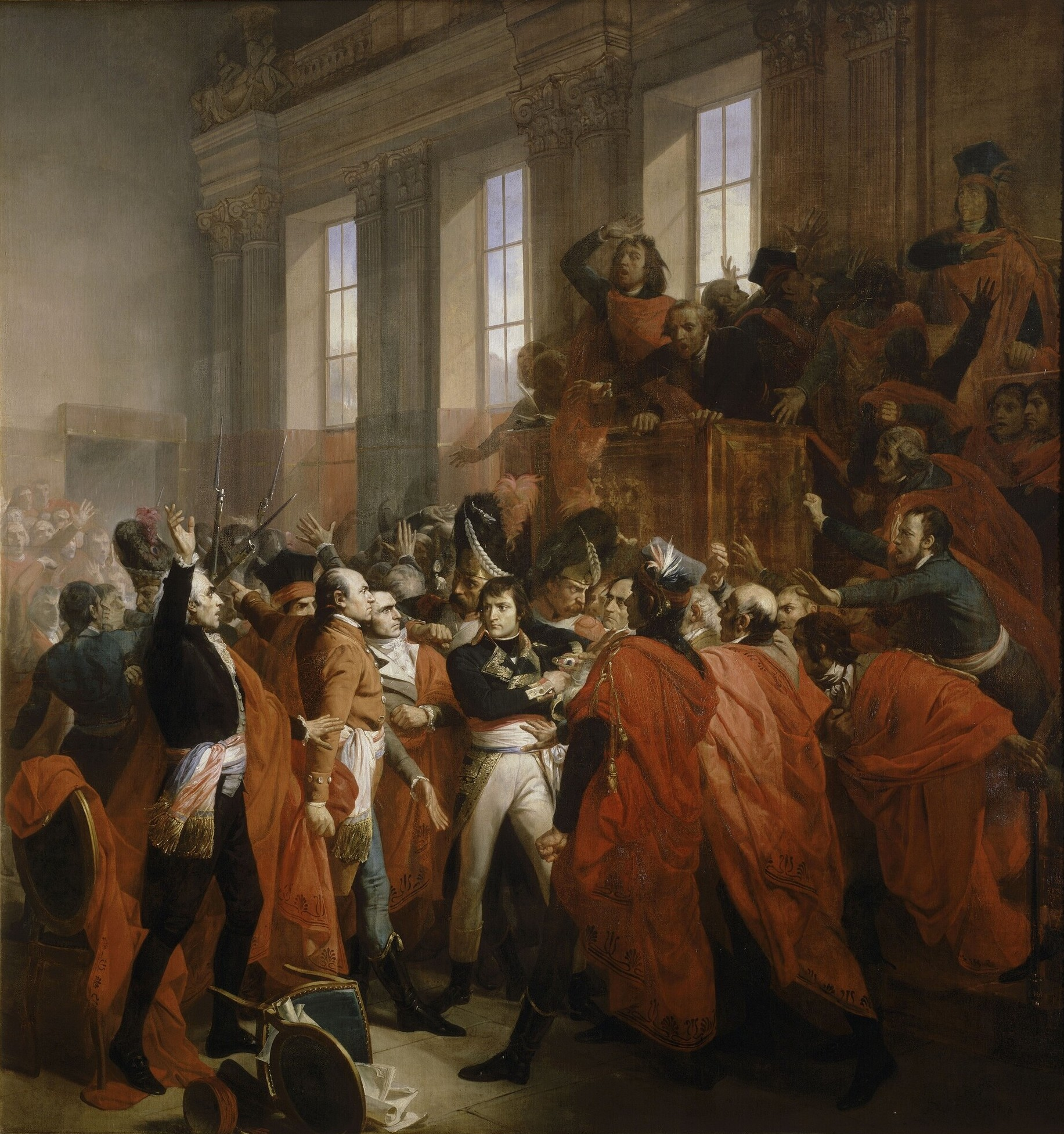
Bonaparte at the Council of Five Hundred at Saint-Cloud by François Bouchot, 1840

Early in the morning of 9 November, army units began taking positions in Paris, and the members of the Council of Ancients were awakened and instructed to come to the Tuileries Palace for an emergency meeting. When they gathered at seven-thirty, they were told that a Jacobin conspiracy to overthrow the government had been discovered and that they should transfer their meeting the next day to the Château de Saint-Cloud, where they would be in safety. The members were asked to approve a decree to move the meeting site, and to appoint Bonaparte as commander of troops in Paris to assure their security. Alarmed, they quickly approved the decree. Bonaparte himself appeared with his staff and told them, "Citizen representatives, the Republic was about to perish. You learned of it and your decree has just saved it". At eleven in the morning, the members of the Council of Five Hundred met at the Palais Bourbon and were given the same message. They agreed to move their meeting the following day to Saint-Cloud.

As planned, by the afternoon Sieyés and Roger Ducos had given their resignations. Talleyrand was assigned to win the resignation of Barras. Talleyrand was supplied with a large amount of money to offer Barras to quit; historians differ on whether he gave the money to Barras or kept it for himself. Barras, seeing the movements of soldiers outside and being assured that he could keep the great wealth he had acquired as a Director, readily agreed to leave the Directory. With three members gone, the Directory could not legally meet. The Jacobin directors Moulin and Gohier were arrested and confined to the Luxembourg Palace under the guard of General Moreau. The first day of the coup had gone exactly as planned.

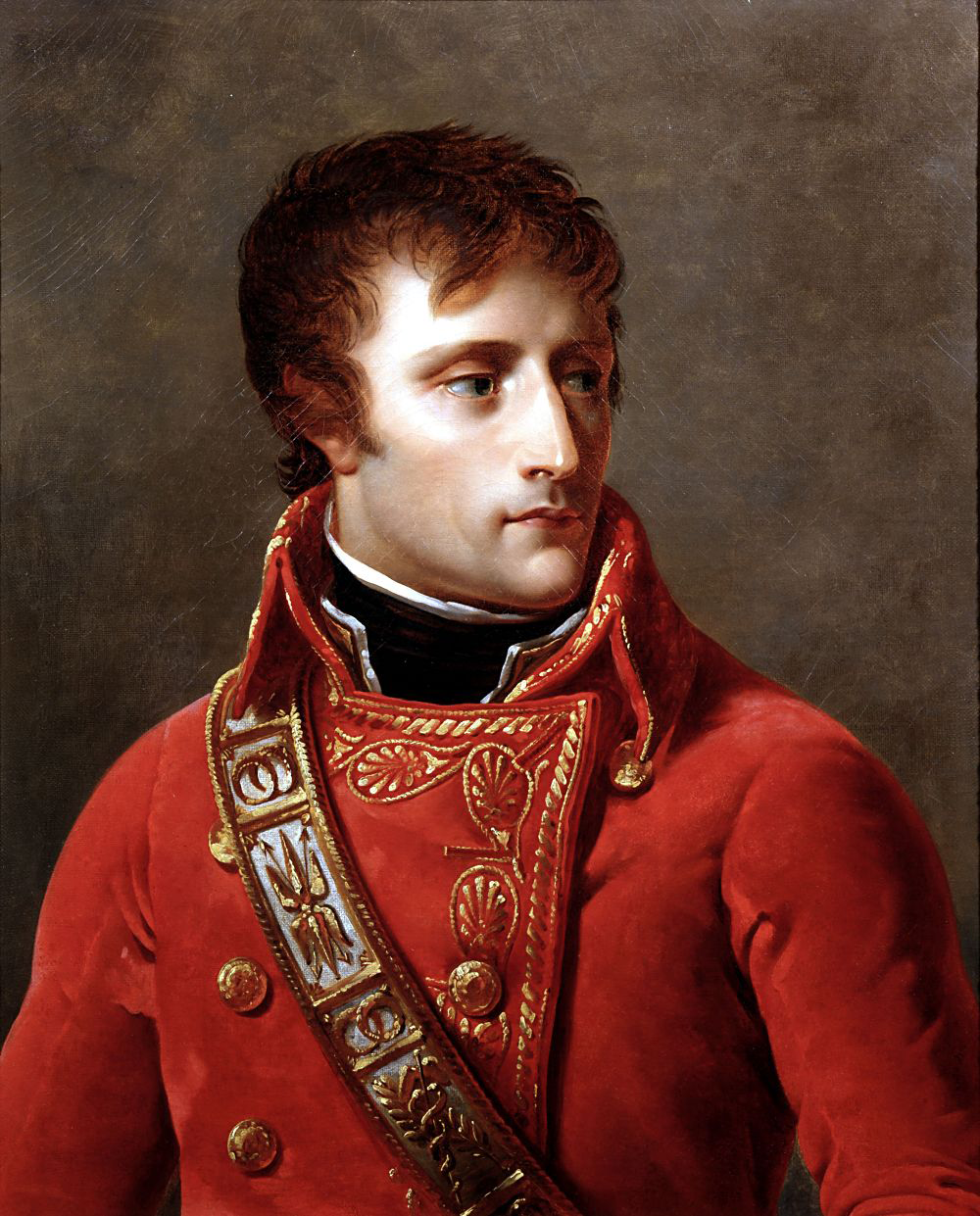
Bonaparte as the new First Consul, by Antoine-Jean Gros, c. 1802, Musée de la Légion d'honneur, Paris

On 10 November, the members of both councils were taken in a procession of carriages with a strong military escort to Saint-Cloud. 6,000 soldiers had already been assembled at the château; because their pay had repeatedly been delayed, they were particularly hostile to the members of the Chambers. Bonaparte spoke first to the Council of the Ancients, assembled in the Orangerie of the domain of Saint-Cloud, and explained that the Directory was no more. Bonaparte was received coldly, but the Council did not offer any opposition. He then moved to the Council of Five Hundred, which was already meeting under the presidency of his brother Lucien. Here he received a far more hostile reception from the Jacobin deputies. He was questioned, jeered, insulted, shouted down, and jostled. His brother was unable to restore calm, and some of the Jacobin deputies began to demand that Bonaparte be declared outside the law, as Robespierre had been. If the Council voted him outside the law, Bonaparte could be arrested and executed immediately without trial. While the deputies raged and argued, Bonaparte and his brother, escorted by a handful of soldiers, left the Orangerie, approached the unit of grenadiers of General Joachim Murat waiting impatiently outside, and told them that the deputies had tried to assassinate Bonaparte with their pens. The grenadiers charged into the hall and quickly emptied it of deputies.

Bonaparte wrote his own official version of what happened, which was published in all newspapers and posted on placards on walls all over France; it vividly described how he had narrowly escaped death from the hands of "twenty Jacobin assassins" and concluded: "The majority returned freely and peacefully to the meeting hall, listened to the propositions which had been made for assuring the public safety, deliberated and prepared a beneficial resolution which should become the new law and basis of the Republic."

With that event, the Directory was finished. A new government, the Consulate, was founded. According to most historians, the French Revolution was over.

== French society during the Directory ==
Despite wars and social turmoil, the population of France continued to grow during the Directory. It was 27,800,000 in 1796, before the Directory, and had grown to 27,900,000 by 1801. Annual population growth had dropped from 16 percent in 1785, before the Revolution, to zero in 1790; but it then rebounded to 36 percent in 1795, then down to 12 percent in 1800. Part of the drop in birth rate during the Directory is attributed to the simplification of divorce, and the change in inheritance laws, which granted equal shares to all descendants. The number of young men killed in the wars during the Directory numbered 235,000 between 1795 and 1799. The high birth rate before the Revolution – together with conscription from conquered and allied states – allowed Napoleon to fill the ranks of his Grande Armée during the Empire between 1804 and 1815.

By the time of the Directory, French society had been dramatically restructured. Nobles and clergy, the two classes which had held most of the power before the Revolution, had disappeared. An estimated one percent of the population, mostly nobles and priests, but also many members of the upper middle class who had supported the monarchy, had emigrated. The number was even higher in border regions, such as Bas-Rhin, where 4.5 percent of the population had left.

=== Rich and poor ===
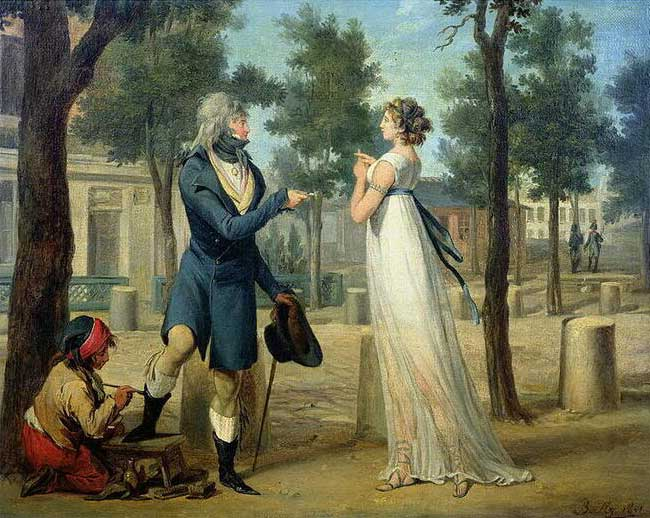
Dress of upper-class Parisians in 1797 by Louis-Léopold Boilly

Under the Directory the middle and upper classes took a dominant position in Paris society, replacing the nobility. Enormous fortunes were made, often by providing supplies to the army or by speculation on real estate. Some parts of the middle and upper classes suffered: the abolition of the old professional guilds of lawyers and doctors brought the ruin of many members, who faced competition from anyone who wanted to use those titles. The merchants and shipowners in Bordeaux, Nantes, Marseille and other ports were ruined by the British naval blockade. Bankers took on a more prominent role, when investment was scarce.

Two new groups gained importance during the Directory. The number of government officials of all levels increased dramatically. The writer Louis-Sébastien Mercier in his Paris pendant la Révolution (1789–1798), ou Le nouveau Paris, published in 1800, wrote: "There is no one who has not complained of the insolence, or the ignorance, of the multitude of government officials employed in the bureaus to sharpen their pens and to obstruct the course of affairs. New has the bureaucracy been carried to a point so so exaggerated, so costly, to exhausting."

Generals and other military officers also grew greatly in importance during the Directory and became a caste independent of the political structure. The Directory had abolished the Jacobin system of political commissioners who supervised and could overrule the military commanders. Generals like Bonaparte in Italy, Hoche in Germany and Pichegru in Alsace directed entire provinces according to their own ideas and wishes, with little interference from Paris. The soldiers of these generals were often more loyal to their generals than to the Directory, as the soldiers of Bonaparte showed during the 1799 coup d'état that ended the Directory.

The working class and poor in Paris and other large cities suffered particularly from the high inflation during the first part of the Directory, which brought higher prices for bread, meat, wine, firewood and other basic commodities. In the last two years of the Directory, the problem was the opposite: with the suppression of the assignats, the money became scarce, the economy slowed, and unemployment grew. The Directory distributed scarce food items, such as cooking oil, butter and eggs, to government employees and to members of the Councils. Before the Revolution, taking care of the poor had been the responsibility of the Church. During the Directory, the government, particularly in Paris and other large cities, was forced to take over this role. To feed the Parisians and prevent food riots, the government bought flour in the countryside at market prices with its silver coins, then gave it to the bakeries, which sold it at the traditional market price of four sous a pound, which was virtually nothing. The subsidies were reduced in the last years of the Directory, paying only for bread, but they were an enormous expense for the Directory. At the beginning, the government tried to provide the standard minimum of one pound of bread a day per person, but the shortage of money reduced the daily ration to sixty grams of bread a day. The government also tried giving rice as a substitute for bread, but the poor lacked firewood to cook it.

Under the Directory a system of public charity "was finally put in place with some success," with legislation passed in November 1796 establishing bureaux de bienfaisance in every commune. These were responsible for providing home relief. Funding for state hospitals was also increased, and legislation from December 1796 placed abandoned children under the state's care.

=== Crime and corruption ===
Economic problems led to a large increase in crime under The Directory, particularly in the countryside. Bands of the unemployed became beggars and turned to robbery, and brigands robbed travelers along the highways. Some of the brigands were former royalists turned highwaymen. They were later celebrated in the novel of Alexander Dumas, Les Compagnons de Jéhu (The Companions of Jehu). The government did not have the money to hire more police, and the great majority of the army was occupied fighting in Italy, Switzerland and Egypt. The growing insecurity on the roads seriously harmed commerce in France. The problem of brigands and highwaymen was not seriously addressed until after a serious wave of crimes on the roads in the winter of 1797–98. The Councils passed a law calling for the death penalty for any robbery committed on the main highways or against a public vehicle, such as a coach, even if nothing was taken. If the crime was committed by more than one person, the robbers were tried by a military tribunal rather than a civilian court. The wave of highway robberies was finally stopped by Bonaparte and the Consulate, which employed special tribunals even swifter and more severe than the Directory tribunals.

Corruption was another serious problem, particularly with the businessmen who provided supplies to the army and government. In one case, the Chevalier enterprise received a contract to build three large warships and two frigates at Rochefort; the company was paid in national property seized from the aristocracy and the Church, but it never constructed the ships, or even bought the materials. Huge contracts for government supplies were passed from the furnishers to sub-contractors, who each paid the furnisher a fee. Sometimes contractors demanded to be paid for their services in advance in silver. They were paid, but never delivered the services, and then reimbursed the government with nearly-worthless assignats. The Directors themselves were accused of receiving money from contractors. The Minister of Finance of the Directory, Dominique-Vincent Ramel-Nogaret, was offered 100,000 francs for a bribe to give a contract by a furnisher named Langlois. Ramel refused and turned Langlois over to the police; however, some ministers and Directors, like Barras, left the government with large fortunes. The Directory was unable to escape the accusations of widespread corruption.

=== Muscadins, Incroyables and Merveilleuses ===
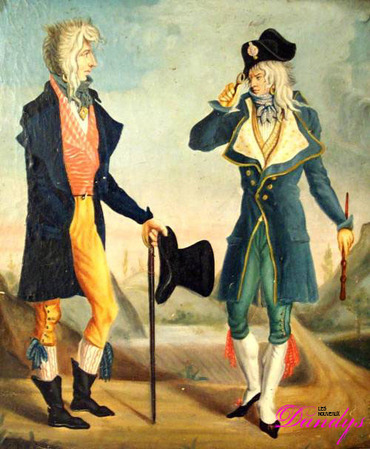
Les deux incroyables: Muscadins or Incroyables wore extravagant costumes in reaction against the recent Reign of Terror, by Carle Vernet, c. 1797

Born in reaction against the strict codes of behavior established during the Convention and the Reign of Terror, the Muscadins were fashionable young men who carried canes and sometimes, in groups, attacked sans-culottes. Following soon afterwards, the Directory had its own fashion reflecting the new social behavior and carried out by young Parisians of both sexes, from middle and upper-class families, often survivors of the excesses of the Revolution, who had lost parents and family members to the guillotine. They were called Incroyables and Merveilleuses and dressed in extravagant costumes. The men, the Incroyables, wore long hair to their shoulders, round hats with broad brims, short coats and silk culottes. Their female counterparts, the Merveilleuses, wore flowing, high-breasted transparent dresses reminiscent of the Greco-Roman era. They frequented balls called Bals des victimes and spoke in their own particular accent and vocabulary, avoiding to pronounce the letter "R", as it was the first letter of the word "Revolution".

=== Marriage and divorce ===
During the Directory, almost all the structures and rules of Paris society had been swept away, but no new structures and rules had yet been created to replace them. The brothers Goncourt meticulously described the period on their Histoire de la société française pendant le Directoire. Caste and rank mattered far less; all the old titles and forms of address had disappeared, along with old customs and social conventions. Men no longer took off their hats when talking to women, and people of different ranks spoke to each other as equals. Society no longer met in private, in the houses of the nobility, but in public, at balls, restaurants and public gardens. As the Goncourts said, "social anarchy" reigned in Paris: "everyone met with everyone." Government ministers could be seen walking or dining with actresses, bankers with courtesans.

"Liaisons were easy", the Goncourts reported, "marriage less so." The old system of marriages arranged between families based on fortune, profession, and social condition was less common. Marriages were no longer controlled by the church, but by the new civil code, which described marriage as "nature in action." Marriage was seen as a temporary, not a permanent state. Children born outside of marriage were given equal status concerning inheritance and other legal matters as those born to married couples. Divorce was much simpler, and could be requested by either the husband or wife. In one period of fifteen months, 5,994 civil law divorces were granted in Paris, of which 3,886 were requested by the wife. Of 1,148 divorces granted on the grounds of "incompatibility of humor", 887 were requested by the wife. The new system also led to a large increase in the number of children born outside of marriage and not wanted; in 1795 four thousand unwanted children in the Department of the Seine were turned over to foundling hospitals.

The breakdown of the old system of arranged marriages led to the creation of the first newspaper where men and women could advertise themselves for suitable spouses, called the Indicateur des marriages. It also led to the establishment of the first marriage bureaus. A businessman named Liardot rented a large former mansion, brought in selected eligible young women as paying guests, and invited men seeking wives to meet them at balls, concerts and card games each given at the house each evening. The men were screened by their profession and education.

=== Amusement – Bals des victimes, pleasure gardens, new restaurants and cafés ===
Although balls were not banned during the Reign of Terror, after the death of Robespierre and the fall of the Jacobins, the city experienced a frenzy of dancing that lasted throughout the period of the French Directory. The Goncourt brothers reported that 640 balls took place in 1797 alone. Several former monasteries were turned into ballrooms, including the Noviciate of the Jesuits, the Monastère des Carmes (turned into a prison where 191 members of the Catholic Church — bishops, priests, monks — were massacred on 2 September 1792), the Séminaire Saint-Sulpice, and even in the former Saint-Sulpice cemetery. Some of the former palatial townhouses of the nobility were rented and used for ballrooms; the Hôtel de Longueville near the Louvre put on enormous spectacles, with three hundred couples dancing, in thirty circles of sixteen dancers each, the women in nearly transparent dresses, styled after Roman tunics. In the public balls, everyone danced with everyone; merchants, clerks, artisans and workers danced with shop women and seamstresses. In the more popular public balls, the cavaliers were charged 80 sous for admission, while women paid 12 sous. At more exclusive balls, admission was five livres. Aristocrats who had survived or returned from exile held their own balls in their houses in the Faubourg Saint-Germain, where Bals des victimes ("Balls of the victims") were attended by invitees who had lost at least one parent to the guillotine.

The formal dancing of the minuet was replaced by a much more passionate new dance, the waltz, which was introduced to Paris during this time from Germany. For summer evening entertainment, Parisians began to abandon the Tuileries Gardens and the gardens of the Palais-Royal and went to the new pleasure gardens which appeared in the neighborhood between the Grands boulevards and the Palais-Royal. The most famous was the Jardin de Tivoli, also known as Folie Boutin or Grand Tivoli, located on rue Saint-Lazare. It had belonged to an aristocrat named Boutin, who was guillotined during the Reign of Terror. It was a vast garden covering 40 arpents (ca. 20 hectares), and could hold as many as ten thousand persons. It had alleys filled with promenaders, greenhouses, illuminations, an orchestra, dancing, a café, and fireworks at night. Other new gardens competed by adding spectacles and pageants. The Jardin des Champs-Élysées offered a pageant of costumed soldiers on horseback performing elaborate maneuvers and firing weapons. The Mousseau (now Parc Monceau) had performers dressed as American Indians dancing and fighting battles. The former Pavillon de Hanovre, which had been part of the Duke of Richelieu's residential complex, featured a terrace for dancing and dining decorated with Turkish tents, Chinese kiosks and lanterns.

Many new restaurants and cafés, usually close to the twenty-three theaters, appeared in and around the Palais-Royal and the new boulevards. A new café, the Tortoni, specializing in ice creams, opened in 1795 at the corner of the boulevard des Italiens and rue Taitbout. The new restaurants in the Palais-Royal were often run by the former chefs of archbishops and aristocrats who had gone into exile. The restaurant Méot offered a menu with over one hundred dishes. Beside the Méot and Beauvilliers, under the arcades of the Palais-Royal were the restaurants and cafés such as Naudet, Robert, Véry, Foy, Huré, Berceau, Lyrique, Liberté conquise, de Chartres (now Le Grand Véfour), and du Sauvage (the last owned by the former coachman of Robespierre). In the cellars of the Palais-Royal were more popular cafés, usually with music, smaller menus at more reasonable prices. One of those, the Postal, offered a menu for just 36 sous. Many of the cafés in the cellars had orchestras; the most famous was the Café des Aveugles, with an orchestra of four blind musicians.

After the Reign of Terror had ended, dining hours for upper-class Parisians returned gradually to what they had been before the Revolution, with déjeuner at midday, dinner at 6 or 7 in the evening, and supper at 2 in the morning. When the theater performances ended at 10 PM, the spectators went to the nearby cafés on the boulevards.

== Church and State ==
The Roman Catholic Church suffered significant loss of property and political influence during the French Revolution. Priests, who refused to take an oath to the Civil Constitution of the Clergy emigrated or were expelled from France under a penalty of death. Church property, from cathedrals to candlesticks, was seized and sold. Church ceremonies were banned, causing clandestine religious services to be conducted in private homes. During the Reign of Terror, at Robespierre's urging, the National Convention, on 7 May 1794, proclaimed a new religion, the Cult of the Supreme Being, which in a little over a year led to the Thermidorian Reaction, and Robespierre's downfall and execution. The Roman Catholic Church had been the official state religion during the monarchy, and the Directors were all anti-religious republicans, but the Directory, with a few exceptions, did not try to impose any particular religious views, and its policy toward priests and religious institutions changed depending upon political events. After the fall of Robespierre, the repression against the Church eased and, although the policy of repression remained, many churches, especially in the provinces, re-opened, and exiled priests began to quietly return.

In November 1797, working with the new decimal-based Republican Calendar, the week of which has ten days, the Directory replaced Sundays and religious holidays with republican celebrations. The tenth day of the week, called decadi, was designated to replace Sunday. The churches still functioning with Constitutional priests were instructed to have mass on decadi, rather than on the day that would have been Sunday in the previous calendar, and decadi became the official non-working day: government employees were off, and schools, shops and markets were closed. To replace saints' and religious days, a whole series of secular holidays was created, in addition to the patriotic celebrations already in place, such as 14 July and important dates of the French Revolution. There were also special days, such as, "the day of the sovereignty of the people"; "the day of youth"; "the day of spouses"; "the day of agriculture" and "the day of the elderly". Certain churches were given new names: the cathedral Notre Dame de Paris was renamed "Temple of the Supreme Being", Saint-Étienne-du-Mont became the "Temple of Filial piety". On decadi, the constitutional priests who performed services were required to share the space with other republican religions and associations who wanted to use the buildings. Large churches were divided into sections for use by various religions.

A new religion, Theophilanthropy, had been founded in 1796 by a Freemason printer-bookseller named Jean-Baptiste Chemin-Dupontès (1760–1852?). It was encouraged by the Director La Révellière-Lépeaux and the Ministry of the Interior, with the state paying for its newspaper. Members believed in God and in the immortality of the soul, but not in the original sin. The sect was similar in form to Calvinism, with readings aloud of texts, hymns and sermons. With the support of the Directory, the sect was given four churches in Paris, including Saint-Roch, Saint-Sulpice and, in April 1798, Notre-Dame de Paris, as well as churches in Dijon, Poitiers and Bordeaux. Members of the sect included some prominent figures, such as General Hoche, the industrialist Éleuthère Irénée du Pont, the painter Jean-Baptiste Regnault, and the American philosopher and political activist Thomas Paine. Beginning in May 1798, however, the Directory began to withdraw support from the newly established deistic sect, which it considered too close to the Jacobins. The sect still had eighteen churches in 1799, but in 1801 it was abolished by Bonaparte.

In Italy, the French army attacked the Papal States governed by the Roman Catholic Church in Italy. In February 1797, Bonaparte occupied Ancona to force Pope Pius VI to negotiate. The pope was obliged to cede Ancona and the northern part of his states, creating the French-sponsored Anconine Republic. The gold and silver in the treasury of the Vatican was taken to France to help support the French currency. Following anti-French riots in Rome in December 1797, a French army under Berthier entered Rome and proclaimed a Roman Republic. Pius VI was taken prisoner by the French Army, and transferred to Valence in France, where he was kept prisoner until his death in 1801.

== Economy ==
=== Finance ===
Many of the economic, social and political woes during the Directory were results of the breakdown of the financial system. The principal problem was a great shortage of money with real value; that is, coins made of silver, and an excess of paper money, the value of which shrank as more and more was printed. The Directory produced only 32 million livres worth of silver-based coins in its first two years. Much of this money was hoarded, since, unlike the paper money, it had and retained real value. As a consequence, the government, to cover its costs, was forced to print millions of notes, first called assignats and then mandats, which were based on the value of property seized from the Church and the clergy. These notes declined in value as more and more were printed. When the notes became nearly worthless, the Directory first devalued them and finally gave up and stopped printing paper money. The shortage of real money in the second part of the Directory led to a new problem: shortage of credit; interest rates rose to about ten percent, double what they had been in 1789. The consequence in the last two years of the Directory was a decline in economic activity, and in wages, while prices rose. The population lost confidence in the money and in the Directory's management.

The lack of credit led to the creation of a number of new private banks, and the growing importance of banks and bankers in the economy. The Caisse des comptes courants, created in June 1796, had some of the most important industrialists and financiers in France as its founders, who would later become the founders of the Banque de France. Several other new private banks followed, which concentrated the wealth of France even more in Paris. Since the nobility had gone into exile, the bankers became the new nobility of France. In other words, bankers became the new aristocrats.

=== Transportation and commerce ===
The transportation system within France was another handicap to the economy. The roads and canals had not been improved or maintained since the overthrow of the monarchy. Major canals that had been started in Burgundy and in the north were unfinished. Maritime commerce was in an even worse situation as a result of the war and blockade of French ports by Britain. During the Directory, the number of French ships of more than two hundred tons was one tenth of what it had been in 1789. The conquest of Belgium, the Netherlands and Italy improved the situation somewhat: French goods could be transported on the neutral ships of these countries, and maritime traffic on the Baltic Sea to Germany became an important trade route for France. However, the British navy largely cut off the trade with the French colonies in the Caribbean, which earlier had provided sugar, cotton, indigo and coffee to France; and the entry of the fleet of Admiral Nelson into the Mediterranean Sea cut off the trade routes there. The major ports of Nantes and Marseille saw their commerce and trade routes disappear.

=== Industry ===
The continual wars and fiscal crises greatly limited the expansion of French industry. The Industrial Revolution had only just begun in France. Production during the Directory had fallen below what it was in 1789. The number of workers in the silk industry in Lyon had dropped from 12,000 before 1787 to 6,500. The cotton textile industry was more successful due to the embargo against British products caused by the war. New factories and new technologies, such as mechanical looms, were introduced in Normandy and in Alsace. However, the technologies were still primitive; the steam engine had not yet arrived in French factories. The chemical industry was also advancing rapidly during the Directory; the chemist and entrepreneur Jean Antoine Claude Chaptal built a chemical factory in Montpellier, which he soon moved to Chaillot, a village west of Paris. The most effective promoter of French industry was François de Neufchâteau, who was Minister of the Interior before becoming a Director in 1797. He planned a new canal system, began work on a new road across the Pyrenees, and organized the first national industrial exposition in Paris, which opened with great success in October 1798. Once he became Consul, Bonaparte copied the idea of the industrial exposition. Despite this bright spot, French industry was primitive: without steam power, most factories in France depended upon water power, and the metallurgy industry still melted iron with wood fires, not oil.

=== Agriculture ===
Agriculture was another weak spot of the French economy. While the country was essentially rural, the methods of farming had not been changed in centuries. The vast majority of farmers had small plots of land, sold little and worked essentially to produce enough food for their families. The price of grain was freed from government control under the Directory in 1797, and farmers could sell their grain at whatever price they could get. Following the Revolution in 1789, the forests had been taken away from the nobles and opened to everyone; as a result, large areas of the forests were immediately cut down, and no new trees planted to replace them. The land of the nobility and Church was taken and redistributed to peasants, but under the new inheritance laws, which gave equal shares to all sons, the size of the farm plots became smaller and smaller. Small plots were not consolidated into larger fields, as was taking place in England at the same time. Most farmers were reluctant to try new methods; they did not want to leave fields idle to recover productivity, or to grow forage crops to feed cattle. Furthermore, during the endless wars of the Directory, thousands of farmers were taken into the army, and thousands of horses and mules needed for farming were taken by the Army for the use of the cavalry and transport. Under these conditions, food shortages and famines occurred regularly in France until the time of Napoleon III.

== Education and science ==
The education system of France was in a chaotic state at the beginning of the Directory. The College of Sorbonne and most other colleges of the University of Paris, had been closed because of their close association with the Catholic Church, and did not reopen until 1808. The schools run by the Catholic Church had also been closed, and any kind of religious instruction forbidden. The government of Jacobins during the Convention created several new scientific institutions, but had concentrated on primary education, which it decreed should be obligatory and free for all young people, but there were few teachers available. By forbidding religious education, seizing the property of the Church and chasing out the clergy, they effectively closed the largest part of the educational system of the country.

At the beginning of the period, the Directory reversed the policy of obligatory and free education for all, largely because of the lack of money to pay teachers. The Directory began to create a system of central schools, with the goal of one in each department, which boys could attend from the age of twelve, with a full curriculum of sciences, history and literature. The state paid a part of the cost, while each student also paid the professor a fee. The new schools had libraries (mostly confiscated from the nobility), small botanical gardens, and museums of natural history. For the first time in French schools, French instead of Latin was the basis of education. Three of these schools were organized in Paris; two of them later became the famous Lycée Henri-IV and Lycée Charlemagne. But by the end of the Directory there were only 992 students in the three Paris schools.

For primary education, each arrondissement in Paris had one school for boys and another for girls, and each commune in the country was supposed to have the same. Since the state lacked money, teachers were paid by the commune or by the students. Students would graduate after learning to read, write and count. In villages, the school was often located in the former church, and teachers were expected, as part of their duties, to carry water, clean the church, ring the bells, and, when needed, dig graves in the churchyard cemetery.

The choices were greater for the children of the middle and upper middle class, as these families had tutors, or sent their children to private schools, but for much of the population, schooling was minimal. There were 56 public schools in the Seine department, which by the population should have had at least 20,000 students; but they had only between 1100 and 1200.

The continual wars during the Directory also had their effect on education. Beginning in October 1797, boys in public schools were required to take part in periodic military exercises, and the Directory established five military schools, called Écoles de Mars, for a total of 15,000 students. Attendance was a requirement for entry into the higher schools of engineering and public works.

The Directory focused its attention on secondary education and especially on creating specialized higher schools for training managers, judges, doctors and engineers, for which there was an immediate and pressing need. The École Polytechnique had been founded by a member of the Directory, Lazare Carnot and the mathematician Gaspard Monge, in 1794. The school became the most prestigious engineering and public works school in France. However, by the end of the Directory there were still no law schools, and only two schools of medicine outside of Paris.

The Institut de France was also founded in 1795 by Lazare Carnot and Monge, to bring together the scientists and researchers, who previously had worked in separate academies, to share knowledge and ideas. It was divided into three large sections: physical sciences and mathematics; moral and political science; and literature and the fine arts. It organized the large party of scientists and scholars who accompanied Napoleon to Egypt, which discovered such treasures as the Rosetta Stone, which allowed the deciphering of Egyptian hieroglyphs. One of the Institut de France first members and speakers was Napoléon Bonaparte, who took the place of Carnot after the latter had been removed from the Directory and left France.

== Art and culture ==
=== Painting – The Salon and the Louvre ===
The artists of Paris were in a difficult situation during the Directory, as their most important patrons, the aristocracy, had been executed or had emigrated; however a new wealthy class was just being formed. Before the Revolution a half-figure portrait could be commissioned from a less-known artist for three hundred livres. During the Directory, the price fell to forty-eight livres. Nonetheless, the Salon took place in the Louvre in 1795 as it had since 1725, before the Revolution, and each year thereafter. The most prominent artist of the Revolution, Jacques-Louis David, closely connected with the Jacobins, was in seclusion in his studio inside the Louvre. At the end of the period, in 1799, he produced one important work, the Intervention of the Sabine Women. However, a new generation of artists, inspired by David, showed their works; François Gérard; Anne-Louis Girodet, a pupil of David, renown for his romantic paintings, particularly a 1797 painting of the prominent actress Mademoiselle Lange as Venus; Carle Vernet, the son and father of famous painters; the portrait painter and miniaturist Jean-Baptiste Isabey, known as the "painter of the kings" or "portraitist of Europe", who painted Queen Marie-Antoinette and Empress Joséphine, and remained active until the Second Empire; the genre painter Louis-Léopold Boilly; Antoine-Jean Gros, a young history and landscape painter, who soon achieved fame and a government position in 1796 with a heroic portrait of Bonaparte at the Battle of Arcole; the romantic landscapes of Hubert Robert; Pierre-Paul Prud'hon, whose work combined Neoclassicism and Romanticism; and a major neoclassical sculptor from the earlier generation, Jean-Antoine Houdon, famous for his busts of George Washington and Voltaire.

Making the Louvre into an art museum had first been proposed in 1747 by Étienne La Font de Saint-Yenne and supported by Denis Diderot in 1765 in the article on the Louvre in the Encyclopédie. The idea was accepted by Louis XVI who, in 1789, began work on converting the Grande Galerie of the Louvre to a museum space. The Revolution intervened, and on 27 July 1793 the Convention decreed the creation of a Museum of the Republic (Musée de la République française), which opened on 10 August 1793, the first anniversary of the storming of the Tuileries.

In 1797, at the end of Bonaparte's triumphant first Italian campaign, convoys of wagons began arriving in Paris, carrying bronze horses, Greek antiquities, tapestries, marble statues, paintings and other works of art taken from Italian cities under the terms of peace agreed by the Austrians. They included works by Raphael, Leonardo da Vinci, Titian, Paolo Veronese and other masters. Other convoys arrived from the Netherlands and Flanders. The more famous works were displayed on wagons in a festive victory parade through the center of Paris. The rest was crammed, unwrapped, into the corridors, galleries and stairways of the Louvre. Work began to rebuild the Galerie d'Apollon and other galleries to provide a home for the 'newly acquired' art.

Art during the Directory

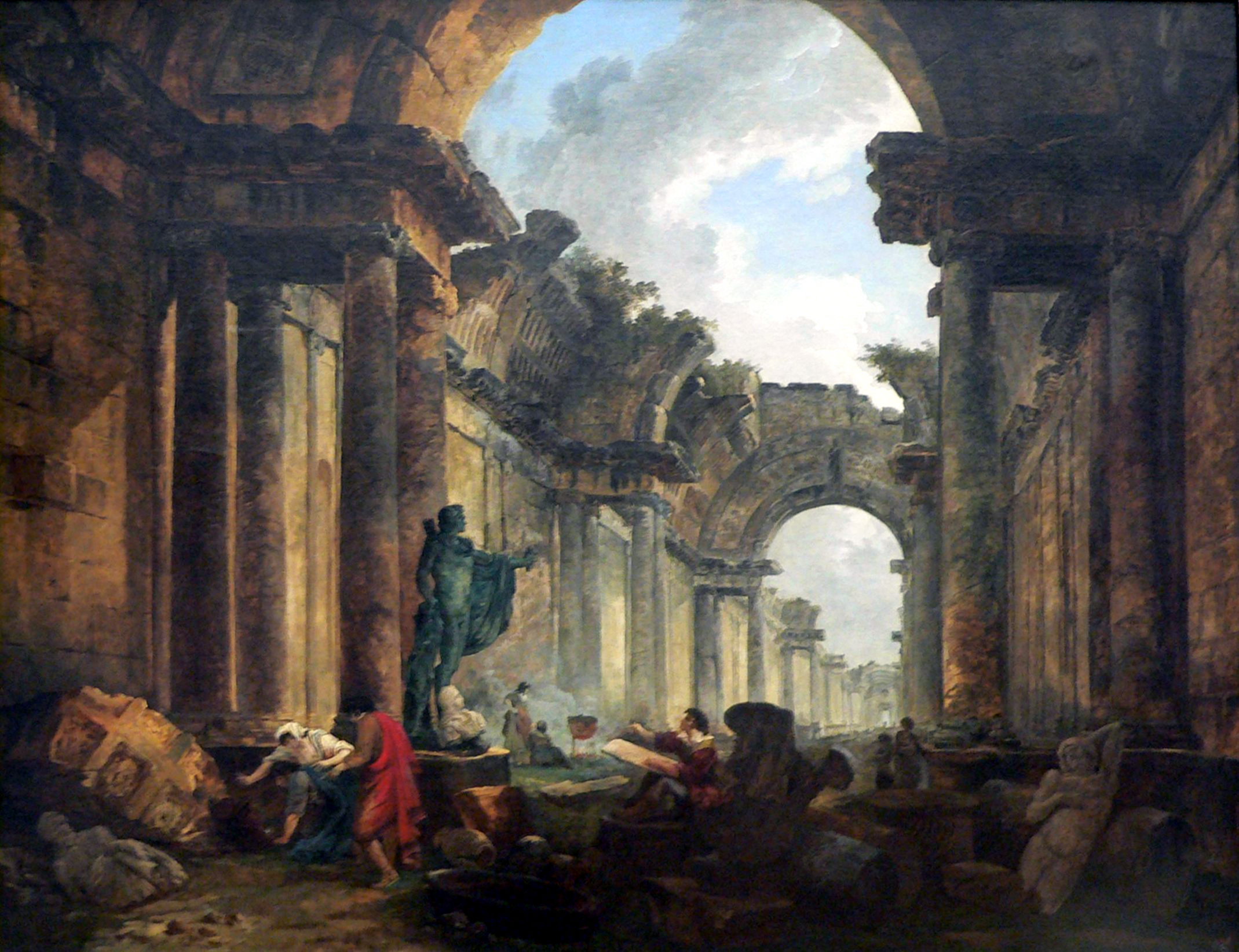
Imaginary view of the gallery of the Louvre as a ruin, by Hubert Robert (1796), Louvre, Paris

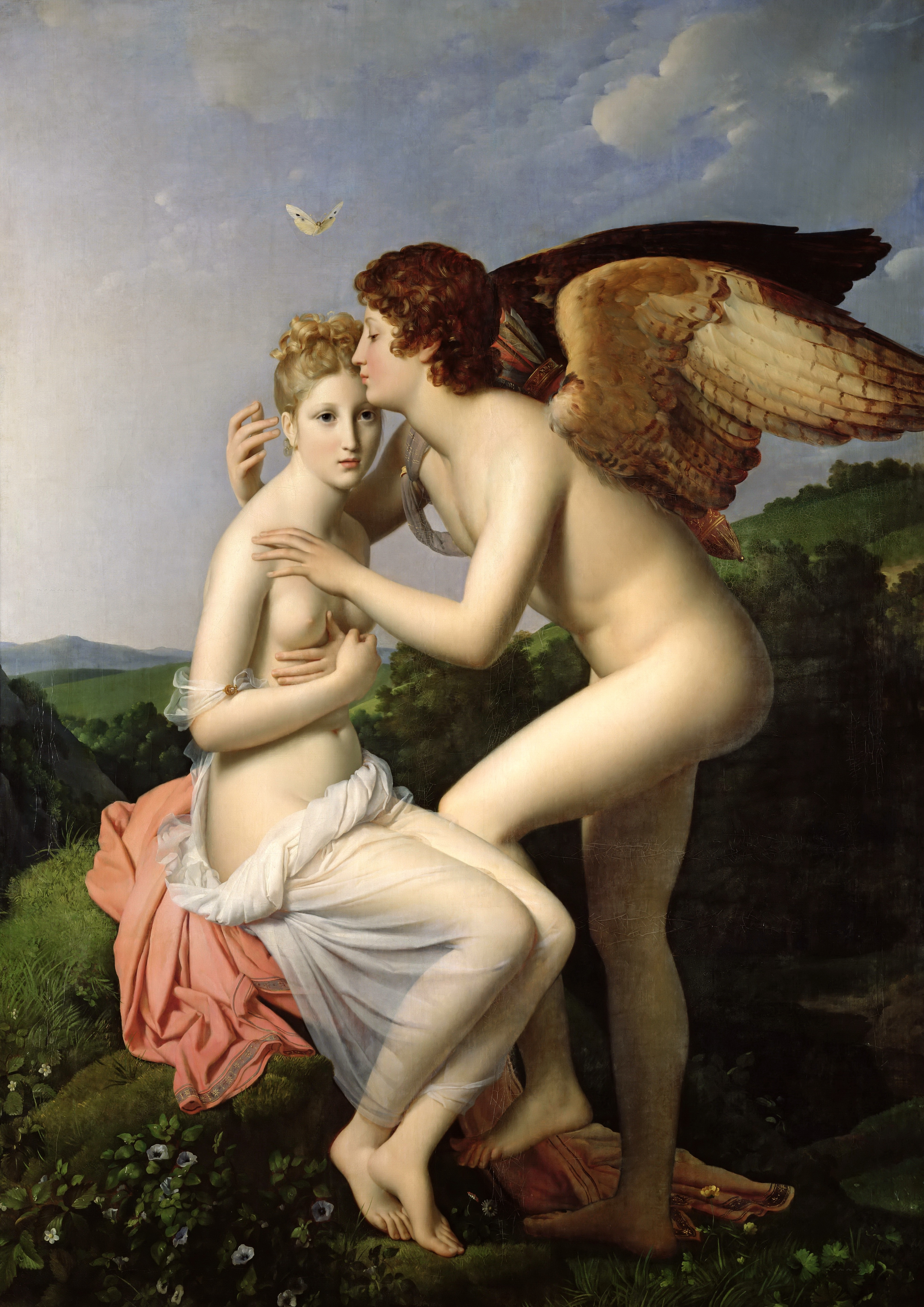
Psyche et l'Amour by François Gérard (1797), Louvre

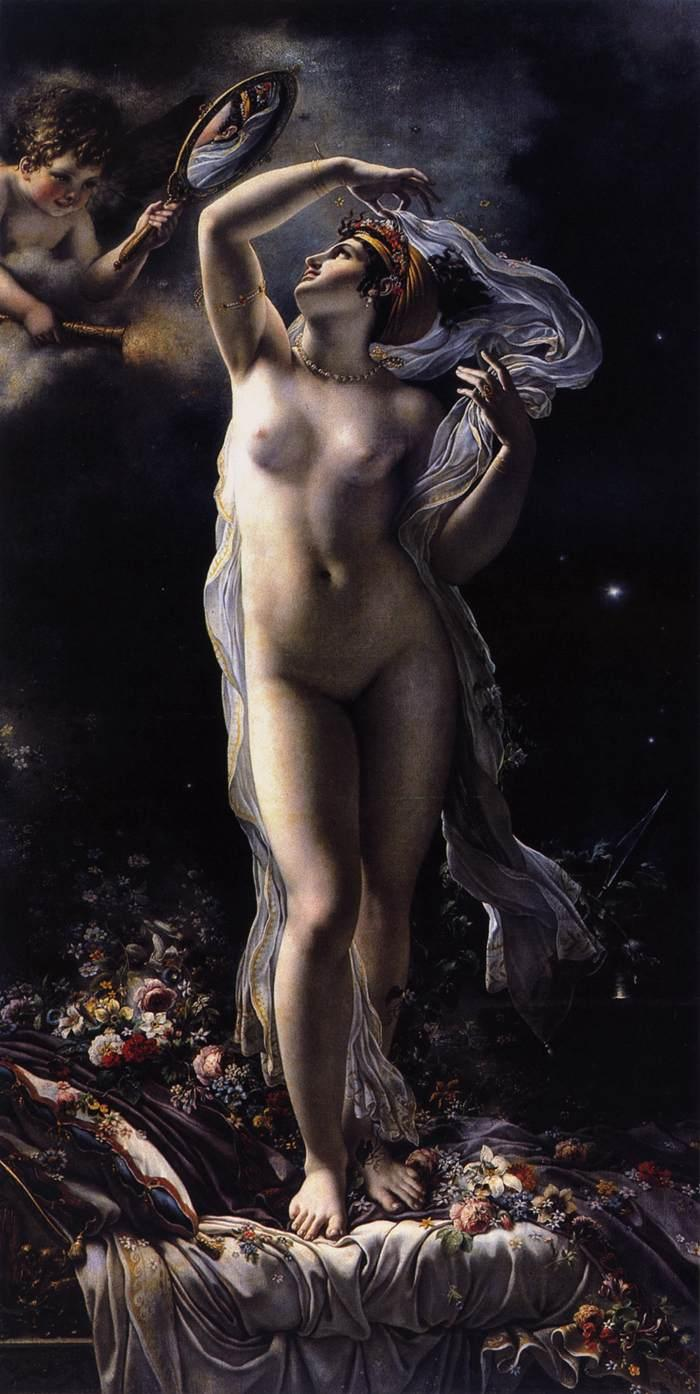
Mademoiselle Lange as Venus, by Anne-Louis Girodet (1798), Museum der bildenden Künste, Leipzig

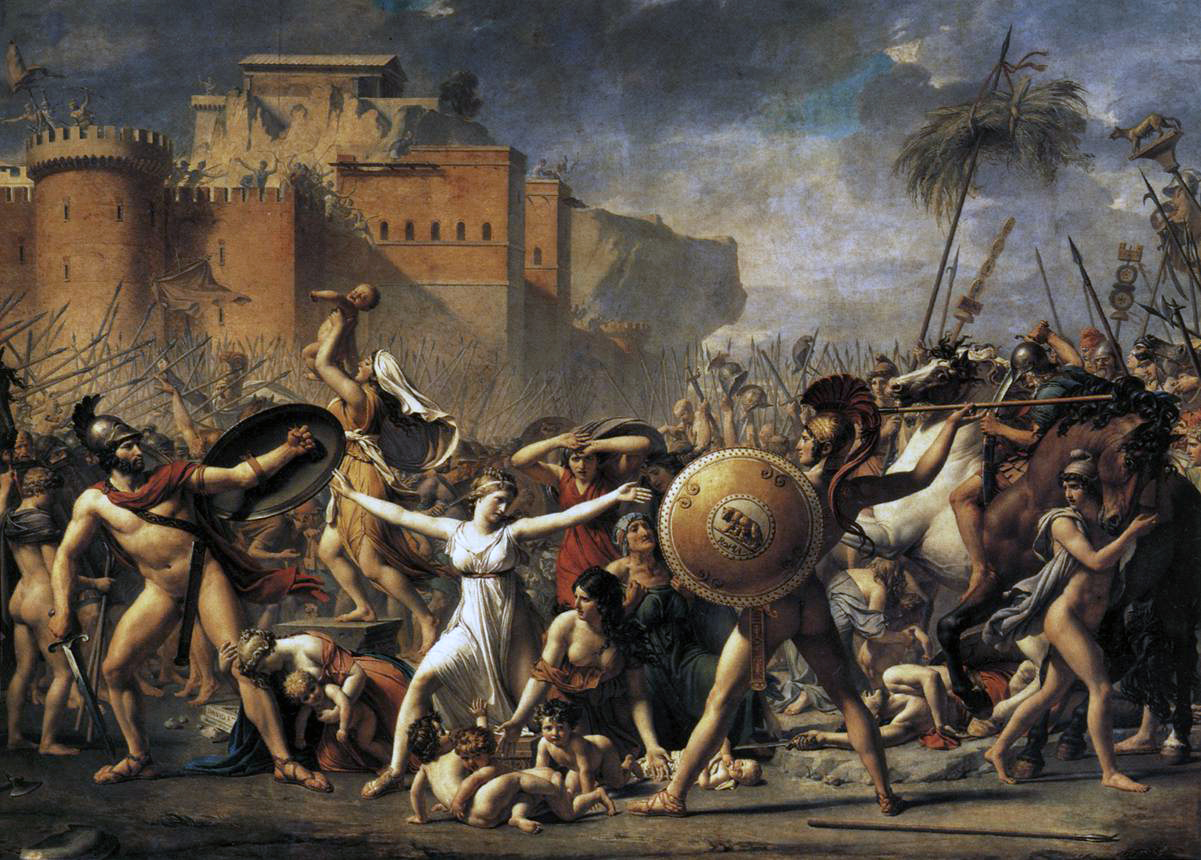
The Intervention of the Sabine Women by Jacques-Louis David (1799), Louvre

=== Furniture and decoration – the Directoire style ===
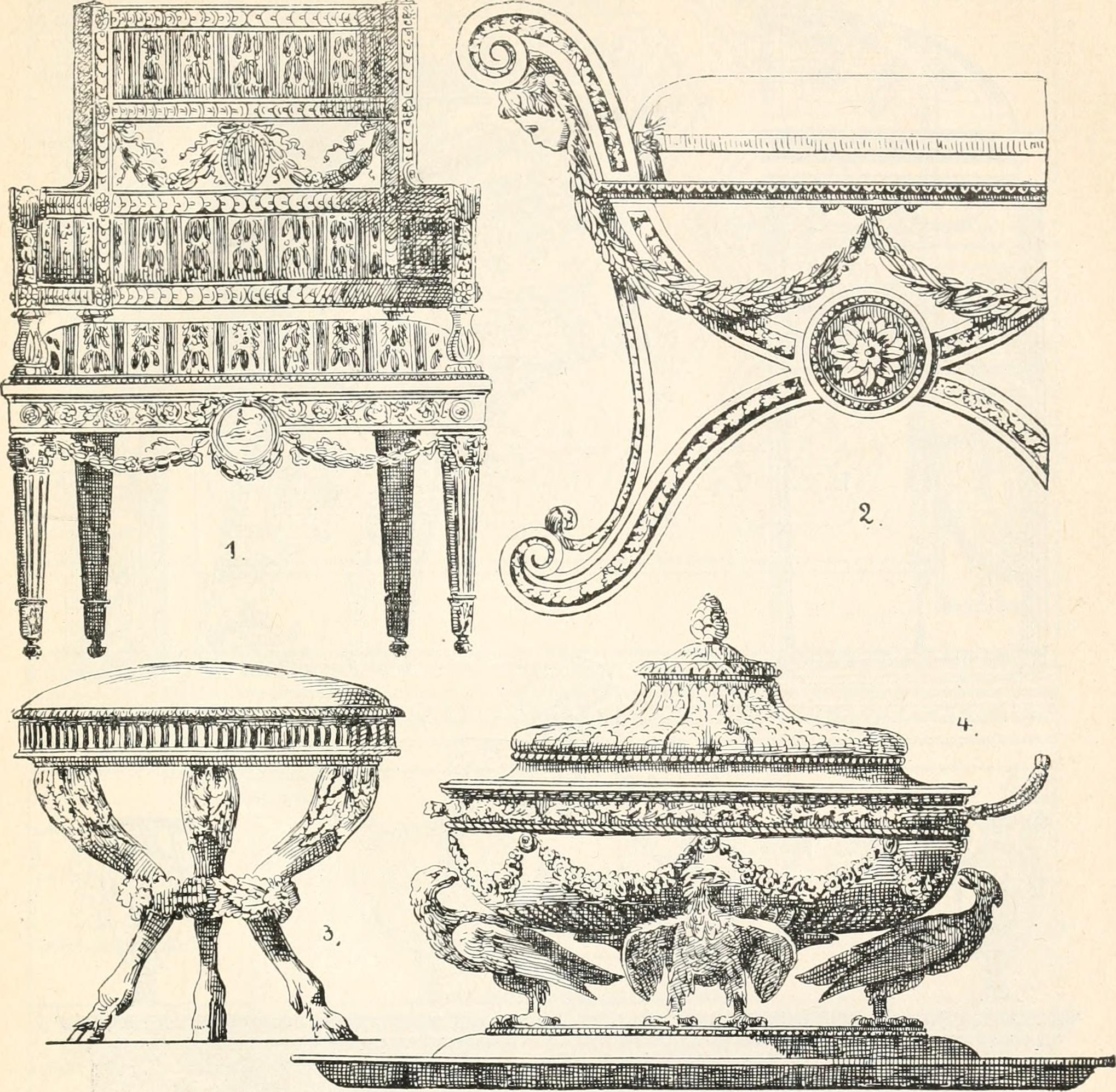
Furniture and objects in the Directory style

The Directory had no public money to spend on architecture, but the newly-wealthy upper class had abundant money to buy châteaux and town houses, and to redecorate them. The style of interior decoration, known as the Directoire style, was one of the notable contributions of the period. It was a transitional style, a compromise between the Louis XVI style and French neoclassicism. Riesener, the famous furniture designer for Louis XVI, did not die until 1806, though his clientele changed from the nobility to the wealthy new upper class. The Directory saw the first widespread use of mahogany, an imported tropical wood used in the making of furniture.

=== Literature ===
The Directory period produced a small number of important literary works, often very critical of the excesses of Revolution. These included Essay on the Revolutions by Chateaubriand, published in 1797, which called for a return to Christian values. At the complete opposite end of the literary scale was the last major work of the Marquis de Sade, The New Justine, published in 1797. Sade also wrote a satirical brochure mocking thinly-disguised characters resembling Bonaparte and Joséphine. Shortly after the end of the Directory, on 6 March 1801, Sade was arrested for Justine and its sequel and ended his days in the insane asylum of Charenton.

== Historiography ==
=== 19th century ===
Historians generally have not been kind to the 'Age of the Directory'. Adolphe Thiers, later twice the Prime Minister and the first president of the Third Republic, wrote the first major history in French of the Revolution, in ten volumes, published between 1823 and 1827. He described the Directory this way:

One of the indispensable qualities of a government is to have good reputation that defends it against unjust attacks. When it has lost this reputation, and when people blame it for the faults of others, and even for bad luck, then it no longer has the ability to govern, and this incapacity should force it to retire. How many governments had been used up during the Revolution!... The Directory had been used up like the Committee of Public Safety before it, and the government of Napoleon that followed. All the accusations against the Directory proved not its faults but its nullity.

Thiers blamed Barras, the only Director who served from the beginning to the end of the Directory, for its failure.

By a bizarre chance, but one that is seen often in the conflicts within revolutions, public opinion had indulgence for the one Director who merited it the least. Barras alone deserved all that was said of the Directory. First of all, he never worked; he left to his colleagues all the burden of business. He spoke only at decisive moments, when his voice was stronger than his courage. He occupied himself with nothing. He only concerned himself with the personnel of the government, which best suited his genius at intrigue. He took a share of all the profits of the government suppliers, and alone of the Directors deserved the accusation of corruption. Despite all of his faults, he was treated differently than the others, first of all because, unlike the other four, he was not a lawyer; and despite his laziness, his debauched habits, his bad manners, and his liaisons with the Jacobins, he alone was credited with 18 Fructidor [the downfall of Robespierre], and he gave the appearance of a man of action, more capable of governing than his colleagues... He was even treacherous toward his colleagues; because all of the criticism that he deserved himself he skillfully managed to shift exclusively onto them.

The most celebrated and vivid description of French society under the Directory was written by the Goncourt brothers, Edmond and Jules, published in 1864, which described the mores, daily life, culture and preoccupations of the Parisians. Its final chapter contained the lines:

Like a guest at the end of an orgy, France was weary; weary of gods, of tribunes, of heroes, of executioners; weary of struggles, of efforts, of cries, of curses, of enthusiasms, of fevers, of intoxications, of storms, of triumphs, of agonies – France was weary of revolutions, coups d'états. constitutions, legislatures... weary of conquests, weary of being saved; weary of Belgium submissive, Italy conquered; of Germany, when all the eagles of Germany had been taken to the Invalides, but France was still not the head; France was weary of climbing into the sky, of amassing empires, of monopolizing the world; France glutted with glory; France broken, sleeping on a mattress of corpses, sleeping on a bed of laurels. France, emptied of men, of silver, of crimes, of ideas, of eloquence; France, like Mirabeau when he was dying, asking of his doctors and his descendants only one single thing: to sleep!

The shortest and simplest description of the entire period, from the Convention to the Empire, was given by Honoré de Balzac in 1837–43 in his novel Illusions perdues. The Spanish Jesuit diplomat Carlos Herrera tells Lucien de Rubempré: "In 1793 the French invented government by the people, which ended with an absolute emperor. So much for your national history".

=== 20th and 21st century ===
In 1909, Pyotr Kropotkin wrote:

The Directory was a terribly orgy of the middle classes, in which the fortunes acquired during the Revolution, especially during the Thermidorean reaction, were squandered in unbridled luxury. For if the Revolution had put in circulation eight milliards of paper-money, the Thermidorean reaction went ten times as fast in that direction, for it issued the amazing sum of thirty milliards in paper within fifteen months.

In 1971, Robert Roswell Palmer wrote:

The Directory became a kind of ineffective dictatorship. It repudiated most of the assignats [paper money] and the debt but failed to restore financial confidence or stability. Guerrilla activity flared up again in the Vendée and other parts of western France. The religious schism became more acute; the Directory took severe measures toward the refractory clergy [those who would not swear allegiance to the government].

In 1971, the American historians Jerome Blum, Rondo Cameron, and Thomas G. Barnes wrote:

It was a government of self-interest rather than virtue, thus losing any claim on idealism. It never had a strong base of popular support; when elections were held, most of its candidates were defeated. Historians have been quite negative on the Directory's use of military force to overturn election returns that went against them. [...] Having by this coup d'état forfeited its claim to be a constitutional government, the Directory henceforth clung to power only by such illegal acts as purges and quashed elections.

In the 1970s, other historians wrote that the achievements of the Directory were minor, though it did establish administrative procedures and financial reforms that worked out well when Napoleon started using them. It was blamed for creating chronic violence, ambivalent forms of justice, and repeated recourse to heavy-handed repression.

In 1994, Isser Woloch wrote:

The Terror had left a dual legacy that made such normalcy impossible. On the one hand, massive disengagement, apathy, and cynicism about government; on the other hand, rancorous, violent hostility between the politically engaged minorities of royalists and Jacobins, between whom the directorial moderates vainly attempted to navigate. Legality became the main casualty in this situation.

In 2007, Howard Brown wrote:

The four years of the Directory were a time of chronic disquiet and the late atrocities had made goodwill between parties impossible. The same instinct of self-preservation which had led the members of the Convention to claim so large a part in the new legislature and the whole of the Directory impelled them to keep their predominance. War was at the center of attention, not only for the survival of France but for the loot and forced payments into the French treasury.

== Leadership and composition ==
The Directory was officially led by a president, as stipulated by Article 141 of the Constitution of the Year III. An entirely ceremonial post, the first presidency was held by Rewbell who was chosen by lot on 2 November 1795. The directors conducted their elections privately, and appointed a new president every three months. The last president was Gohier, who resigned during Brumaire after his arrest by troops under the Bonapartist general Jean Victor Marie Moreau.

The following table displays all Directeurs and their dates of service:

Evolution of the Directory's Composition
Centre (Thermidorians) Right-wing (Conservatives-Clichyens) Left-wing (Radical republicans) Other (Maraisards)
The five directors appointed on 10 Brumaire year IV (1 November 1795):
Paul Barras; 2 November 1795 – 9 November 1799	Louis-Marie de la Révellière; 2 November 1795 – 18 June 1799	Jean-François Rewbell; 2 November 1795 – 16 May 1799	Lazare Carnot; 2 November 1795 – 4 September 1797	Étienne-François Letourneur; 2 November 1795 – 20 May 1797
Paul Barras; 2 November 1795 – 9 November 1799	Louis-Marie de la Révellière; 2 November 1795 – 18 June 1799	Jean-François Rewbell; 2 November 1795 – 16 May 1799	Lazare Carnot; 2 November 1795 – 4 September 1797	François Barthélemy; 20 May – 4 September 1797
Paul Barras; 2 November 1795 – 9 November 1799	Louis-Marie de la Révellière; 2 November 1795 – 18 June 1799	Jean-François Rewbell; 2 November 1795 – 16 May 1799	Philippe Antoine Merlin; 4 September 1797 – 18 June 1799	François de Neufchâteau; 4 September 1797 – 15 May 1798
Paul Barras; 2 November 1795 – 9 November 1799	Louis-Marie de la Révellière; 2 November 1795 – 18 June 1799	Jean-François Rewbell; 2 November 1795 – 16 May 1799	Philippe Antoine Merlin; 4 September 1797 – 18 June 1799	Jean-Baptiste Treilhard; 15 May 1798 – 17 June 1799
Paul Barras; 2 November 1795 – 9 November 1799	Louis-Marie de la Révellière; 2 November 1795 – 18 June 1799	Emmanuel Joseph Sieyès; 16 May – 9 November 1799	Philippe Antoine Merlin; 4 September 1797 – 18 June 1799	Jean-Baptiste Treilhard; 15 May 1798 – 17 June 1799
Paul Barras; 2 November 1795 – 9 November 1799	Roger Ducos; 18 June – 9 November 1799	Emmanuel Joseph Sieyès; 16 May – 9 November 1799	Jean-François Moulin; 18 June – 10 November 1799	Louis-Jérôme Gohier; 17 June – 10 November 1799
After the Coup of 18 Brumaire (9 November 1799), Barras, Ducos and Sieyès resigned. Moulin and Gohier, refusing to resign, were arrested by General Moreau.

== Presidents of the Directory ==
- November 1795 – 4 September 1797: Jean-François Rewbell
- 4 September 1797 – 4 December 1797: Louis-Marie de La Révellière-Lépeaux
- 4 December 1797 – 25 February 1798: Paul Barras
- 25 February 1798 – 26 May 1798: Philippe-Antoine Merlin de Douai
- 26 May 1798 – 26 November 1798: Jean-François Rewbell
- 26 November 1798 – 26 May 1799: Paul Barras
- 26 May 1799 – 18 June 1799: Philippe-Antoine Merlin de Douai
- 18 June 1799 – 23 September 1799: Emmanuel-Joseph Sieyès
- 23 September 1799 – 9 November 1799: Louis Gohier

== Ministers ==
The ministers under the Directory were:

Ministry	Start	End	Minister
Foreign Affairs	3 November 1795	16 July 1797	Charles-François Delacroix
Foreign Affairs	16 July 1797	20 July 1799	Charles Maurice de Talleyrand-Périgord
Foreign Affairs	20 July 1799	10 November 1799	Charles-Frédéric Reinhard
Justice	3 November 1795	2 January 1796	Philippe-Antoine Merlin de Douai
Justice	2 January 1796	3 April 1796	Jean Joseph Victor Génissieu
Justice	3 April 1796	24 September 1797	Philippe-Antoine Merlin de Douai
Justice	24 September 1797	20 July 1799	Charles Joseph Mathieu Lambrechts
Justice	20 July 1799	10 November 1799	Jean Jacques Régis de Cambacérès
War	3 November 1795	8 February 1796	Jean-Baptiste Annibal Aubert du Bayet
War	8 February 1796	16 July 1797	Claude Louis Petiet
War	16 July 1797	22 July 1797	Lazare Hoche
War	22 July 1797	21 February 1799	Barthélemy Louis Joseph Schérer
War	21 February 1799	2 July 1799	Louis Marie de Milet de Mureau
War	2 July 1799	14 September 1799	Jean-Baptiste Bernadotte
War	14 September 1799	10 November 1799	Edmond Louis Alexis Dubois-Crancé
Finance	3 November 1795	8 November 1795	Martin-Michel-Charles Gaudin
Finance	8 November 1795	13 February 1796	Guillaume-Charles Faipoult
Finance	13 February 1796	20 July 1799	Dominique-Vincent Ramel-Nogaret
Finance	20 July 1799	10 November 1799	Jean-Baptiste Robert Lindet
Police	4 January 1796	3 April 1796	Philippe-Antoine Merlin de Douai
Police	3 April 1796	16 July 1797	Charles Cochon de Lapparent
Police	16 July 1797	25 July 1797	Jean-Jacques Lenoir-Laroche
Police	25 July 1797	13 February 1798	Pierre Jean-Marie Sotin de La Coindière
Police	13 February 1798	2 May 1798	Nicolas Dondeau
Police	2 May 1798	29 October 1798	Marie Jean François Philibert Lecarlier d'Ardon
Police	29 October 1798	23 June 1799	Jean-Pierre Duval
Police	23 June 1799	20 July 1799	Claude Sébastien Bourguignon
Police	20 July 1799	10 November 1799	Joseph Fouché
Interior	3 November 1795	16 July 1797	Pierre Bénézech
Interior	16 July 1797	14 September 1797	François de Neufchâteau
Interior	14 September 1797	17 June 1798	François Sébastien Letourneux
Interior	17 June 1798	22 June 1799	François de Neufchâteau
Interior	22 June 1799	10 November 1799	Nicolas Marie Quinette
Navy and colonies	3 November 1795	16 July 1797	Laurent Jean François Truguet
Navy and colonies	16 July 1797	27 April 1798	Georges René Le Peley de Pléville
Navy and colonies	27 April 1798	2 July 1799	Étienne Eustache Bruix
Navy and colonies	2 July 1799	10 November 1799	Marc Antoine Bourdon de Vatry

== See also ==
- Directoire style
- Paris in the 18th century

== Sources ==
- Black, Jeremy (2002). From Louis XIV to Napoleon: The Fate of a Great Power. Routledge. ISBN 9780203006382.
- Church, Clive H., The Social Basis of the French Central Bureaucracy under the Directory 1795–1799, in Past & Present No. 36, April 1967, pp. 59–72 in JSTOR.
- Devlin, Jonathan D. (1989). "A problem of royalism: General Amédée Willot and the French directory". Renaissance and Modern Studies. 33 (1): 125–143. doi:10.1080/14735788909366534. ISSN 0486-3720.
- Doyle, William (1990). The Oxford History of the French Revolution (2 ed.). Oxford University Press. pp. 318–40. ISBN 9780199252985.
- Fierro, Alfred (1996). Histoire et dictionnaire de Paris. Robert Laffont. ISBN 978-2-221-07862-4.
- Fontana, Biancamaria (2026). Desk Revolutionaries: The Men of the French Directory, 1795–9. Reaktion Books. ISBN 978-1836392491.
- Furet, François (1996). The French Revolution, 1770–1814. France: Blackwell Publishing. ISBN 978-0-631-20299-8.
- Garrioch, David (2015). La fabrique du Paris révolutionnaire. La Découverte/Poche. ISBN 978-2-7071-8534-1.
- de Goncourt, Edmond and Jules (1864). Histoire de la société française pendant le Directoire. Ernest Flammarion.
- Goodwin, A., The French Executive Directory – A Revaluation, in History, 1937, 22.87 pp. 201–218
- Gottschalk, Louis R., The Era of the French Revolution (1715–1815), Houghton Mifflin Company, 1929, pp. 280–306
- Héron de Villefosse, René (1959). Histoire de Paris. Bernard Grasset.
- Gough, Hugh (1998). The Terror in the French Revolution (2010 ed.). Palgrave. ISBN 978-0230201811.
- Hunt, Lynn, David Lansky and Paul Hanson, The Failure of the Liberal Republic in France, 1795–1799: The Road to Brumaire, in Journal of Modern History (1979) 51#4, pp. 734–759 in JSTOR; statistical profile of the different factions
- Jainchill, Andrew, The Constitution of the Year III and the Persistence of Classical Republicanism, in French Historical Studies, 2003, 26#3 pp, 399–435
- Kennedy, Michael (2000). The Jacobin Clubs in the French Revolution: 1793–1795. Berghahn Books. ISBN 978-1-57181-186-8.
- Lefebvre, Georges (1977). La France Sous Le Directoire (1795–1799) (in French). Éditions Sociales.
- Lefebvre, Georges, French Revolution from 1793–1799, Columbia University, 1964, pp. 171–211
- Lefebvre, Georges; Soboul, Albert (1965). The Directory. London: Routledge and Kegan Paul. OCLC 668426465.
- Lyon, E. Wilson, The Directory and the United States, in American Historical Review, 1938, 43#3, pp. 514–532. in JSTOR
- Lyons, Martyn (1975). France under the Directory (2008 ed.). Cambridge University Press. ISBN 978-0521099509.
- Montague, Francis Charles; Holland, Arthur William (1911). "French Revolution, The" . In Chisholm, Hugh (ed.). Encyclopædia Britannica. Vol. 11 (11th ed.). Cambridge University Press. pp. 154–171. "excerpts are included in this article"
- Palmer, Robert R, The Age of the Democratic Revolution: A Political History of Europe and America, 1760–1800, vol 2: The Struggle, 1964, pp. 211–262, 549–576.
- Ross, Steven T, The Military Strategy of the Directory: The Campaigns of 1799, in French Historical Studies, 1967, 5#2 pp. 170–187 in JSTOR.
- Rudé, George (1988). The French Revolution. New York: Grove Weidenfeld. ISBN 978-0802132727.
- Schama, Simon (1989). Citizens, A Chronicle of The French Revolution (2004 ed.). Penguin. ISBN 978-0-14-101727-3.
- Soboul, Albert (1975). The French Revolution, 1787–1799: From the storming of the Bastille to Napoleon. New York. pp. 477–547. ISBN 9780394712208.
- Sutherland, D.M.G., The French Revolution and Empire: The Quest for a Civic Order, 2nd ed. 2003, 430 pages, excerpts and text search pp. 263–301.
- Tulard, Jean; Fayard, Jean-François; Fierro, Alfred (1998). Histoire et Dictionnaire de la Révolution Française (in French). Robert Laffont. ISBN 978-2-221-08850-0.
- Woronoff, Denis (1984). The Thermidorean regime and the directory: 1794–1799. Cambridge University Press. ISBN 978-0-521-28917-7.

=== Primary sources ===
- Stewart, John Hall, ed. A Documentary Survey of the French Revolution (1951), pp. 654–766
