= Armée d'Orient (1798) order of battle =

Details of Napoleon's Army during expendition in Egypt

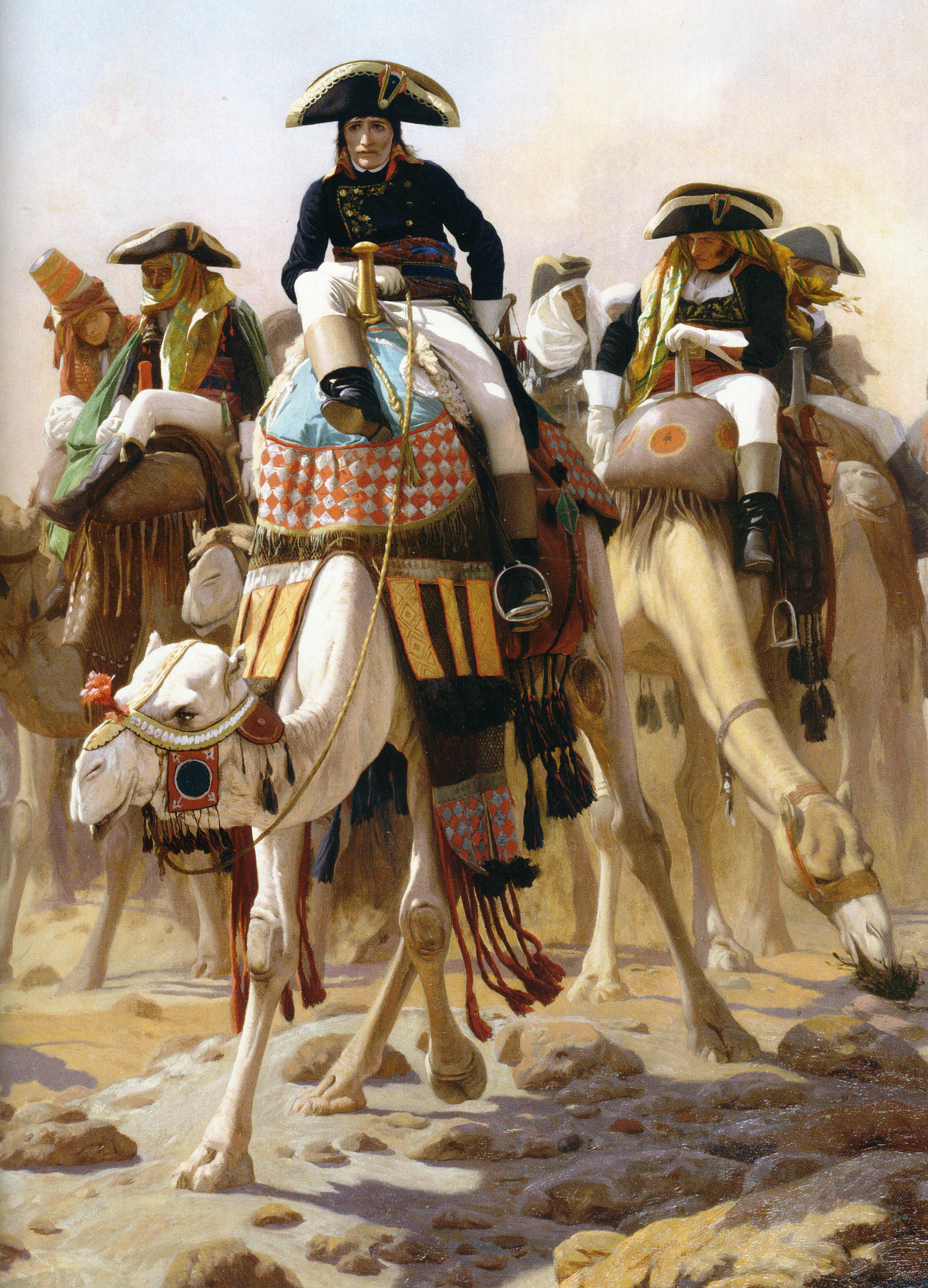
General Bonaparte and staff in Egypt

The Armée d'Orient (English: Army of the Orient) was the French military force gathered by the French Directory to send on the expedition to Ottoman Egypt in 1798. The expedition had the intention of barring Great Britain's route to its colonies in India and was put under the command of Napoleon Bonaparte.

== Land forces ==
- Commander in chief: Général Bonaparte
- Chef d'état-major: Général Berthier
- Numbers: 45,000 of which 38,500 in Egypt

=== Compagnie des guides ===
- Numbers: 500 men on foot and on horseback

=== Division Desaix ===
- Commander: Général Desaix
- Numbers: 5,600 men
- Made up of the following regiments:
  - 21e demi-brigade d'infanterie légère : 3 battalions, 2,100 men in total
  - 61e demi-brigade d'infanterie de ligne : 3 battalions, 1,900 men in total
  - 88e demi-brigade d'infanterie de ligne : 3 battalions, 1,600 men in total

=== Division Reynier ===
- Commander: Général Reynier
- Numbers: 3,460 men
- Made up of the following regiments:
  - 9e demi-brigade d'infanterie de ligne : 3 battalions, 1,620 men in total
  - 85e demi-brigade d'infanterie de ligne : 3 battalions, 1,840 men in total

=== Division Kleber ===
- Commander: Général Kléber
- Numbers: 4,900 men
- Made up of the following regiments:
  - 2e demi-brigade d'infanterie légère : 3 battalions, 1,450 men in total
  - 25e demi-brigade d'infanterie de ligne : 3 battalions, 1,650 men in total
  - 75e demi-brigade d'infanterie de ligne : 3 battalions, 1,800 men in total

=== Division Menou ===
- Commander: Général Menou
- Numbers: 5,200 men
- Made up of the following regiments:
  - 22e demi-brigade d'infanterie légère : 3 battalions, 1,100 men in total
  - 13e demi-brigade d'infanterie de ligne : 3 battalions, 2,500 men in total
  - 69e demi-brigade d'infanterie de ligne : 3 battalions, 1,600 men in total

=== Division Bon ===
- Commander: Général Bon
- Numbers: 4,700 men
- Made up of the following regiments:
  - 4e demi-brigade d'infanterie légère : 2 battalions, 1,100 men in total
  - 18e demi-brigade d'infanterie de ligne : 3 battalions, 1,650 men in total
  - 32e demi-brigade d'infanterie de ligne : 3 battalions, 1,950 men in total

=== Division Dumas (cavalry) ===
- Commander: Général Dumas
- Numbers: 3,050 men
- Made up of the following regiments:
  - 7e régiment bis de hussards : 3 squadrons, 630 men in total
  - 22e régiment de chasseurs à cheval : 3 squadrons, 280 men in total
  - 3e régiment de dragons : 2 squadrons, 390 men in total
  - 14e régiment de dragons : 3 squadrons, 640 men in total
  - 15e régiment de dragons : 2 squadrons, 230 men in total
  - 18e régiment de dragons : 4 squadrons, 330 men in total
  - 20e régiment de dragons : 3 squadrons, 530 men in total

=== Division Dommartin (Artillery) ===
- Commander of the artillery: Général Dommartin
- Firepower: 171 artillery pieces, including:
  - 35 siege cannons
  - 24 howitzers
  - 40 mortars
- Numbers: 3,150 men
- Split between:
  - 3 cavalry companies
  - 6 infantry companies
  - 3éme Compagnie du 4éme Régiment d'Artillerie à Cheval
  - 2éme Compagnie du 5éme Régiment d'Artillerie à Cheval
  - 3éme and 11éme Compagnies du 1er Régiment d'Artillerie à Pied
  - 1er, 2e, 6e, 7e, and 10éme Compagnies du 4éme Régiment d'Artillerie à Pied
  - 9 companies of demi-brigades

=== Division Caffarelli (engineers) ===
- Commander (engineers): Général Caffarelli du Falga
- Numbers: 1,200 men
- Split between:
  - 775 sappers
  - 190 miners
  - 165 workers
  - 25 balloonists

=== Garrison troops ===
- Corsica: 3,600 men of:
  - 23e demi-brigade d'infanterie légère: 3 battalions, totalling 2,500 men
  - 1er bataillon de la 86e demi-brigades d'infanterie de ligne: 1 battalion, totalling 1,100 men
- Malta: 8,000 men
  - Division Chabot: 4,000 men of:
    - 6e demi-brigade d'infanterie de ligne: 3 battalions, totalling 1,000 men
    - 79e demi-brigade d'infanterie de ligne: 3 battalions, totalling 3,000 men
  - Division Vaubois: 4,000 men of
    - 3e bataillon de la 7e demi-brigade d'infanterie légère: 1 battalion, totalling 1,150 men
    - 19e demi-brigade d'infanterie de ligne: 2 battalions, totalling 1,050 men
    - 1er bataillon de la 80e demi-brigade d'infanterie de ligne: 1 battalion, totalling 550 men
    - Various elements drawn from 6e and 41e demi-brigade d'infanterie de ligne as well as from 23e demi-brigade d'infanterie légère: 1,200 men

== Sea forces ==
Known as the Escadre d'Orient ('Squadron of the Orient'), the ships of the taskforce transported the land troops and at times during the campaign operated in tandem with them.

- Commanded by Admiral Brueys
- Numbers: 335 boats, of which only 55 were armed

=== Ships of the line ===
15, of which 2 were armed "en flûte"

- Flagship : Orient, 120 guns
- Hospital ship : Causse, 70 guns (captured at Venice)
  - 80 guns :
    - Guillaume-Tell
    - Franklin
    - Tonnant
  - 74 guns :
    - Spartiate
    - Aquilon
    - Généreux
    - Guerrier
    - Peuple-Souverain
    - Timoléon
    - Heureux
    - Mercure
  - 64 guns :
    - Conquérant
    - Dubois (captured at Venice)

=== Frigates ===
13 (7 armed "en flûte")

  - 40 guns :
    - Justice
    - Diane
    - Junon
    - Artémise
  - 36 guns :
    - Alceste
    - Sérieuse (notable for being the subject of a poem by French Romantic—Alfred de Vigny)
    - Sensible
    - Courageuse
    - Carrère
    - Muiron
    - Leoben
  - 30 guns :
    - Mantoue
    - Montenotte

=== Others ===
- 1 corvette, the 30 gun Badine
- 79 brigs (of which 5 were armed)
- 38 bomb vessels (of which 4 were armed)
- 3 avisos armés
- 75 tartanes (of which 6 were armed)
- 6 chaloupes-canonnières
- 2 felouques canonnières
- 1 schooner
- 9 pinques
- 82 polacres
- 11 trois-mats à hunes (three-masters; barques)
