= Jean-Baptiste Muiron =

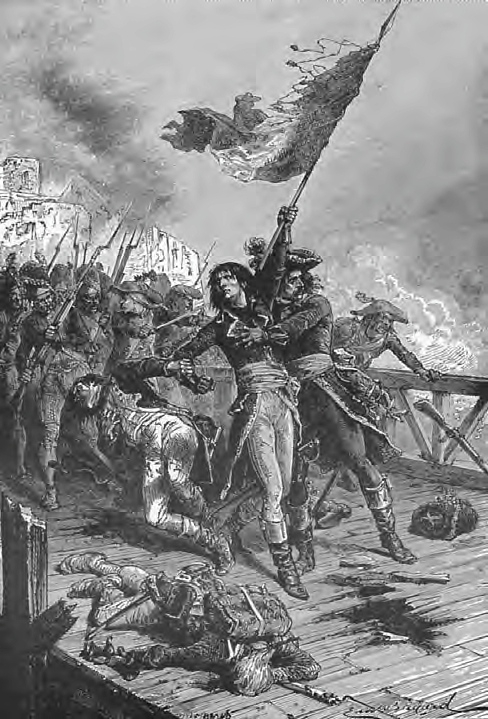
Napoleon at Arcole

Jean-Baptiste Muiron (10 January 1774 – 15 November 1796) was a French Army officer. He rose to fame by allegedly sacrificing himself to save the life of General Bonaparte at the Battle of the Bridge of Arcole. A frigate captured in Venice, the Muiron, was renamed in his honour.

== Career ==
He was born in Paris to the family of a fermier général du roi. In 1793, he served as an artillery captain at the Siege of Toulon, where he met and befriended Bonaparte. He was later promoted to colonel and served as Bonaparte's aide-de-camp during the Campaign of Italy.

Muiron was killed at the Battle of the Bridge of Arcole, allegedly covering Bonaparte with his body to protect him. Bonaparte wrote highly of him in his subsequent letters.

== Legacy ==
After Venice was captured by Bonaparte in retaliation for the massacre of the crew of the lugger Libérateur d'Italie, the peace treaty was composed of secret articles stipulating that three ships of the line and two frigates would be surrendered to the French. These ships were incorporated into the French Navy and renamed for prominent fallen men of the Italian campaign. Laharpe, Stengel, Beyrand, Carrère and Muiron.

Late in his life, Napoléon is reported to have considered to use "Colonel Muiron" as a pseudonym.

== Bibliography ==
- Jean-Luc Gourdin, L'Ange gardien de Bonaparte, le colonel Muiron, Pygmalion, 1996. Grand Prix d'Histoire de la Fondation Napoléon 1996.
- La frégate La Muiron., Trois-Ponts, Nicolas MIOQUE
