= Fauveau =

Fauveau is a French surname. Notable people with the surname include:

- Félicie de Fauveau (1801–1886), French sculptor
- François-Auguste Fauveau de Frénilly (1768–1848), French diplomat, writer, poet and civic leader
- Johann Fauveau (born 1984), French Muay Thai kickboxer
- Philippe Fauveau (1926–2023), French rower
