= Léonard Bourdon =

French politician

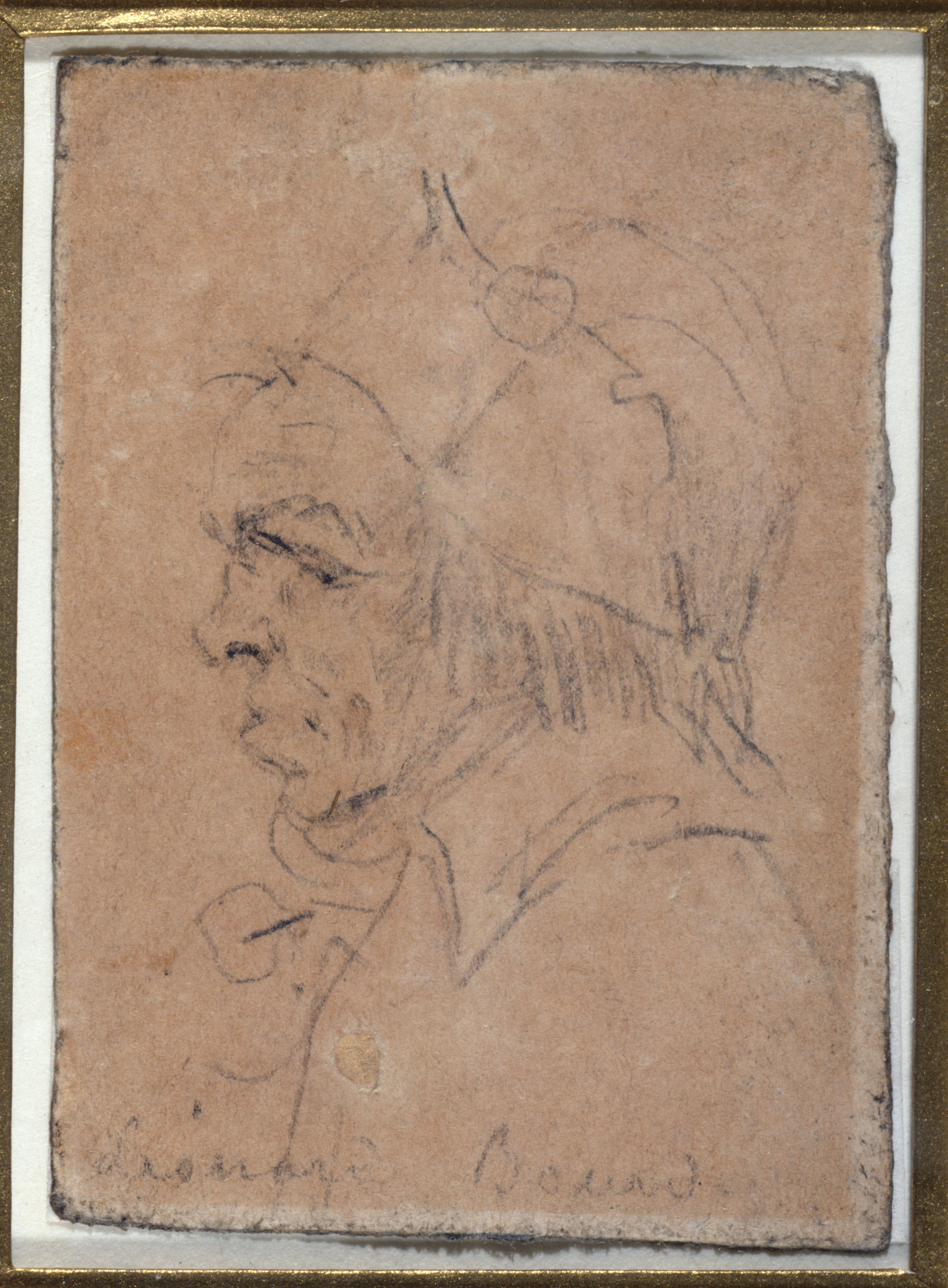
- Sketch of Léonard Bourdon by Georges-François-Marie Gabriel, Paris, Musée Carnavalet
- Born: Louis Jean Joseph Léonard Bourdon de la Cronière; 6 November 1754; Alençon
- Died: May 29, 1807 (aged 52); Breslau
- Education: University of Orléans
- Occupation: Politician
- Relatives: Marc-Antoine Bourdon de Vatry, Brother

Louis Jean Joseph Léonard Bourdon de la Cronière (6 November 1754, Alençon – 29 May 1807, Breslau) was a French politician of the French Revolution. He was president of the National Constituent Assembly and substitute for the procureur of the Commune de Paris.

Despite his depiction in the traditional historiography, where he is presented as "a fanatical Montagnard, a fierce terrorist, a violent man, thirsty for blood, corrupt and decadent", he is depicted more sympathetically by modern historians.

== Biography ==
He was born in 1754 in Alençon, Normandy, in the large family of a wealthy administrative officer who was among the king's advisers. He studied law in Orleans and in 1779 achieved the position of avocat aux conseils, a lawyer with the right of representing litigants before the Council of State and Court of Cassation. In 1785, he settled in the Faubourg Saint-Marcel quarter of Paris, ceasing any activity as a lawyer.

In 1788 he publishes a pamphlet called Plan d’un établissement d’éducation nationale, which lays out his plans for various educational reforms. This made him the recipient of the royal letters patent placing him in charge of a new learning institution, the Société Royale d'Émulation, which closed down after only two years.

He was elected to the Estates General of 1789, where he continued his educational proselytism, proposing a national education plan, both in the Paris department and in the new legislative assembly.

A member of the Jacobin club, he became more involved in politics after the attempted flight attempt of Louis XVI, in June 1791. His activist fervor gained him a gruesome reputation for the coldness with which he would oversee massacres and executions during the Terror. At the same time, he also opened up a new school, named "Société des Jeunes Français". In the committee of public education he supported a new plan of national public instruction. He also submitted an economic project of "granaries of plenty", to fight against food scarcity and speculation on the grain and flour trade.

As the tension within the Jacobins mounted towards height of the Reign of Terror, he fell out of grace with Robespierre, who denounced him as an "intriguer despised by all".

During the Thermidor Reaction, he joined in the actions that lead to the arrest and execution of Robespierre, but this crisis was also the end of his political career. In April 1795 he was arrested as a conspirator and imprisoned in the fortress of Ham. He was released in October 1795, as part of an amnesty.

For the next few years, he would be entrusted several small administrative or diplomatic jobs, while he was still trying to propose a reform of education. Finally, in 1800 he abandoned these plans and managed to join the board of directors of the Toulon military hospital.

This position led him in the wake of the Grand Armée, as director of military hospitals, to Breslau (now Wrocław, Poland), where he died on May 29, 1807.
