= Marc-Antoine Bourdon de Vatry =

French Naval Minister

Marc-Antoine Bourdon Vatry (24 November 1761 in Saint-Maur-des-Fossés – 22 April 1828 in Paris), brother of Louis-François Bourdon, was a French Naval Minister.

He began in 1778 as a clerk in the offices of the navy at Brest, and as Expeditionary Secretary of Jean-Baptiste Donatien de Vimeur, comte de Rochambeau in the United States (1781–1783).

Back in France he was appointed director of the colonies at the Department of Navy (1792–1797). On 3 July 1799, he became Minister of Marine and remained until 1800.

Under the Consulate and Empire, he was maritime prefect of Le Havre, prefect of Vaucluse, and Maine-et-Loire in 1809, Prefect of Gênes. This town erected a statue in memory of the work he had done in this port. During the Hundred Days, he was prefect of the Isère.

Political offices
Preceded by Charles Maurice de Talleyrand-Périgord	Minister of the Navy and the Colonies; 2 July 1799 – 22 November 1799	Succeeded by Pierre-Alexandre-Laurent Forfait
