= Catherine Grand =

French salon-holder (1761–1835)

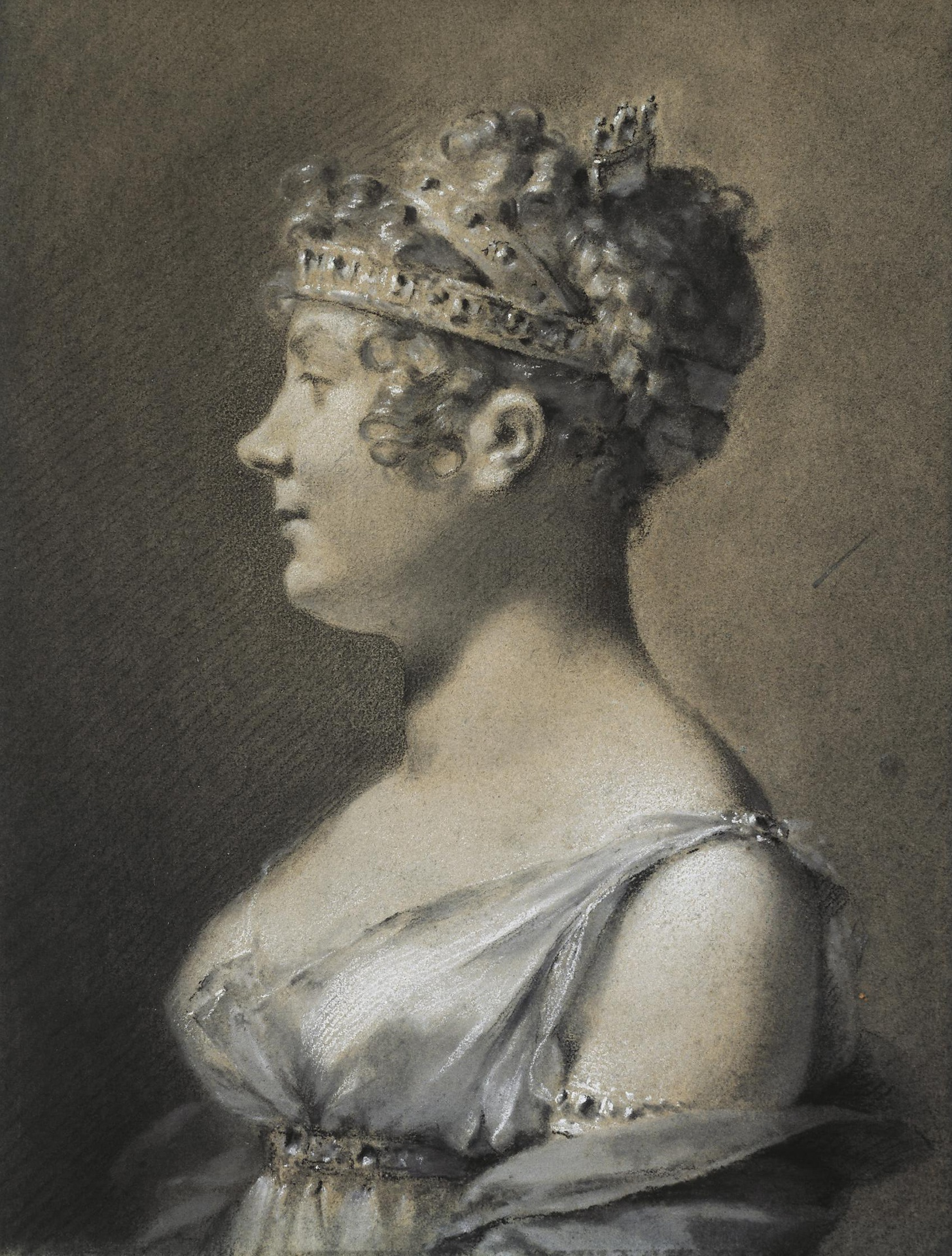
- Portrait by Pierre-Paul Prud'hon, 1806–1807
- Born: Catherine Noël Worlée; 21 November 1761; Tranquebar, Danish India
- Died: 10 December 1835 (aged 73); Paris, Kingdom of France
- Resting place: Montparnasse Cemetery, Paris
- Other names: Madame Grand; Catherine Noël de Talleyrand-Périgord, Princesse de Bénévent
- Occupation: Courtesan
- Spouses: George François Grand (m. 1777; ann. 1798) Charles-Maurice de Talleyrand-Périgord (m. 1802)

Catherine Noël de Talleyrand-Périgord (née Worlée; 21 November 1761 (Note: Sources variously report her date of birth as 21 November 1761 or 1762; the 1761 date reported by Busteed (1908) p. 231 is used in this article.) – 10 December 1835) was a French courtesan and noblewoman. Born in India as the daughter of a French Indies Company official, she married George Grand, a clerk of the British East India Company. She had a liaison with Bengal councillor Philip Francis in Calcutta.

In 1782, she relocated to Paris, where she was known as Madame Grand and became a popular courtesan having relationships with several powerful men. She became the mistress and later the wife of French diplomat Charles Maurice de Talleyrand-Périgord, the first Prime Minister of France. Catherine was known for her exceptional beauty, which was captured in her 1783 portrait by Élisabeth Vigée Le Brun. She was Princess of Benevento by marriage from 1806 until her death.

== Early life in India ==
=== Family and parentage ===
Catherine Noël Worlée (also spelled Werlée) was born in the town of Tranquebar, Danish India, in 1761 or 1762. She had both French and Danish heritage. Both her parents were French Catholics: her father Pierre Werlée was a colonial official of the French Indies Company stationed at nearby Pondicherry, and her mother was Laurence Alleigne, daughter of a French armourer in India. Laurence was Pierre's second wife: in 1744, at the age of 23, he had married Marguerite da Silva, who was aged 14. Marguerite died after having borne him four children, Catherine's half-siblings.

At the time of Catherine's birth, her father was a British prisoner of war who had been captured during the Third Carnatic War; Catherine's family had fled to Tranquebar when British forces besieged Pondicherry in 1760. After his release the family settled in Chandernagore, a town in French India near Calcutta. She had a basic private education and was taught to read and write by her mother but excelled at art, dance, and etiquette. Her brother, Jean Xavier, was born on 20 September 1766.

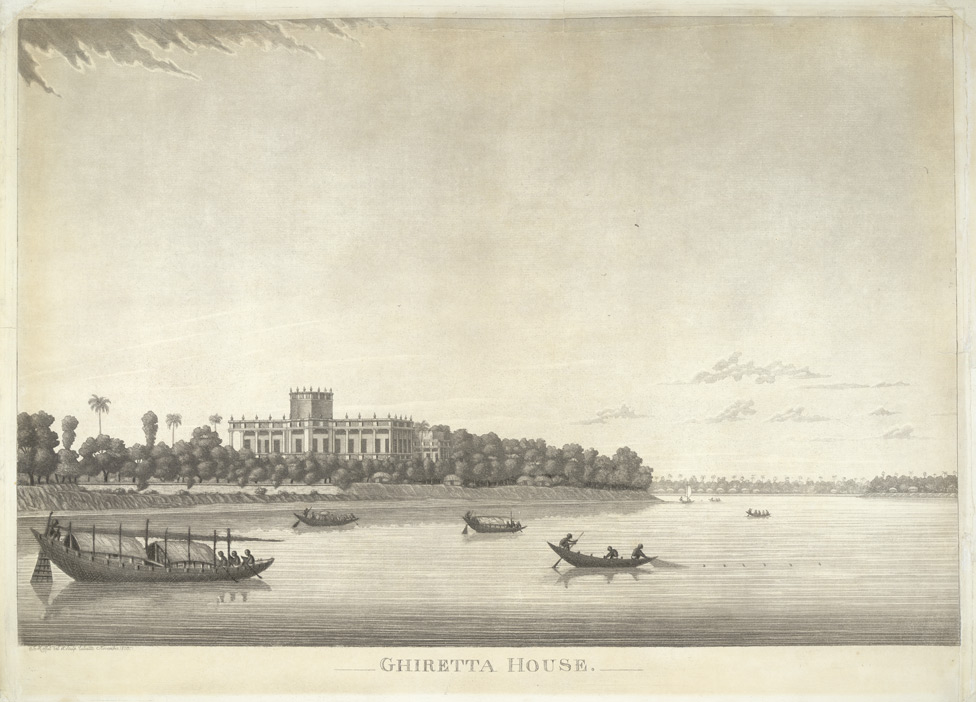
Catherine met her first husband, George Grand, at Ghiretta House Engraving by James Moffat, Calcutta, 1800

=== First marriage ===
Catherine met George François Grand, a clerk of the British East India Company at a ball at Ghiretta House, situated upon the banks of the Hooghly River. Also spelled Ghyretti House, it was considered "one of the finest buildings in India". It served as the country house of the French Governors of Chandernagore.

George Grand was born sometime after 1750 to a Swiss Huguenot merchant family. He was educated in Lausanne and apprenticed in London, before being sent to India as a cadet in the Bengal Army in 1766. He was promoted to the rank of captain before resigning from military service in March 1773 owing to illness and returned to England. In 1775, Grand obtained a "writership" (a clerkship at the East India Company) and sailed again for India, arriving in Calcutta via Madras in June 1776. His annual salary was a respectable 1,300 rupees. His diary, published in 1814, provides much information about their marriage.

George Grand and Catherine were married in a Catholic ceremony in Chandernagore on 10 July 1777, followed by a Protestant ceremony a few hours later. Mrs Grand was well-received by the English ton of Calcutta. The newly-weds took up residence in a house near the neighborhood of Alipore in south Calcutta.

=== Early affairs ===
Mrs Grand caught the attention of British colonial official Philip Francis, a member of the Supreme Council of Bengal, who was discovered trying to seduce her at her home on the night of 8 December 1778 by her servants. The scandal caused Catherine's husband to send her back to live with her family in Chandernagore, and successfully sued Francis for adultery, receiving 50,000 rupees in damages on 6 March 1779. Catherine became Francis's mistress soon after.

On 17 August 1780, Francis was seriously injured in a duel with his political rival Warren Hastings and decided to leave India. Francis and Catherine embarked on separate ships in December 1780 – Francis to London and Catherine to Paris to live with her relatives – although they planned to meet later on the Continent. Once aboard, Catherine began an affair with fellow passenger Thomas Lewin, a colonial official from Madras and later father of Harriet Grote. Their ship was diverted to Cádiz, and the pair arrived together in London by a different ship in the summer of 1781.

== Life in Europe ==
In 1782, Mrs Grand and Lewin moved to Paris. Their affair ended amicably soon after, and Lewin settled an annuity on her. She restarted her relationship with Francis, who would rendezvous with her several times in Paris and the resort town of Spa.

=== 1783 portrait ===
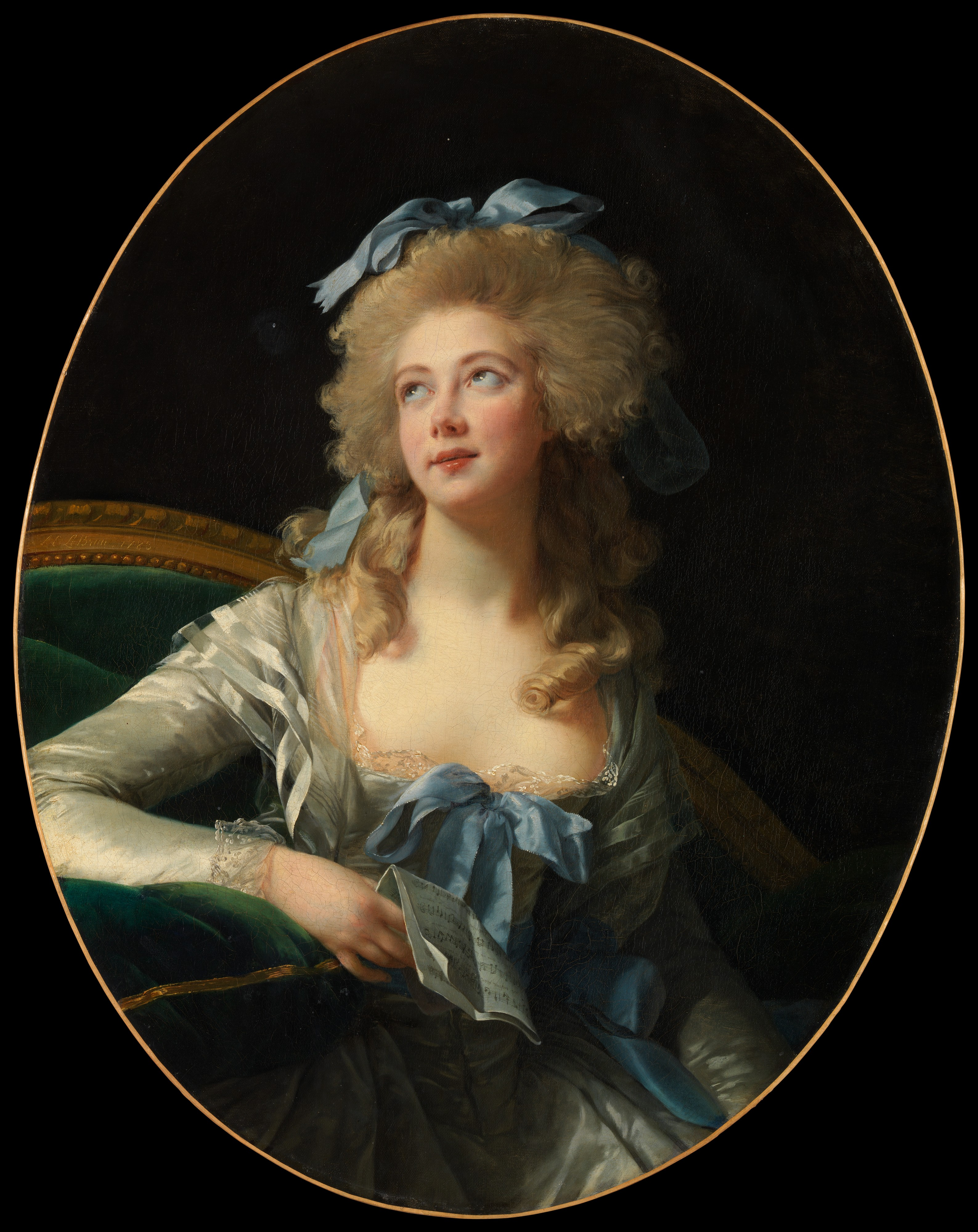
Madame Grand, 1783 portrait by Élisabeth Louise Vigée-Le Brun

French artist Élisabeth Vigée Le Brun painted Catherine's portrait in 1783, which was exhibited at the Parisian Salon of the Royal Academy the same year, one of at least ten portraits Le Brun submitted. The oval painting shows Madame Grand holding a musical score. Curators at the Met have compared her pose, and in particular her eyes, to Domenichino's Saint Cecilia (1618). It was favorably received, one of the reviewers remarking on its "volupté enchanteresse" ("bewitching sensuality").

The painting is in the collection of the Metropolitan Museum of Art, in New York. It has travelled extensively for exhibition, including at the 1939 New York World's Fair, twice at the Grand Palais of Paris, at the Yokohama Museum of Art in 1989, and various other museums around the world.

=== Parisian courtesan ===
A beautiful blonde, musical and clever, Catherine became a very fashionable courtesan, and was often referred to as "l'indienne". Catherine served as companion to Claude Antoine de Valdec de Lessart, Édouard Dillon, Louis Monneron, François-Auguste Fauveau de Frénilly and others. In later years, Édouard Colmache would describe her thus:

Madame Grand had the kind of beauty which is the rarest and most admired in Europe. She was tall and slight, with that languor in her carriage peculiar to creole ladies; her eyes were well open and affectionate, her features delicate, her golden hair playing in numberless curls, set off a forehead as white as a lily.

Catherine fled to Britain in 1792 during the French Revolution, but returned to Paris in 1797. In 1798 she was arrested on suspicion of being a foreign agent, but was released upon the intervention of French Foreign Minister Charles Maurice de Talleyrand. In a letter to Paul Barras, Talleyrand describes her as "an Indian, very beautiful, very idle, one of the laziest women I have ever known."

=== Talleyrand and second marriage ===
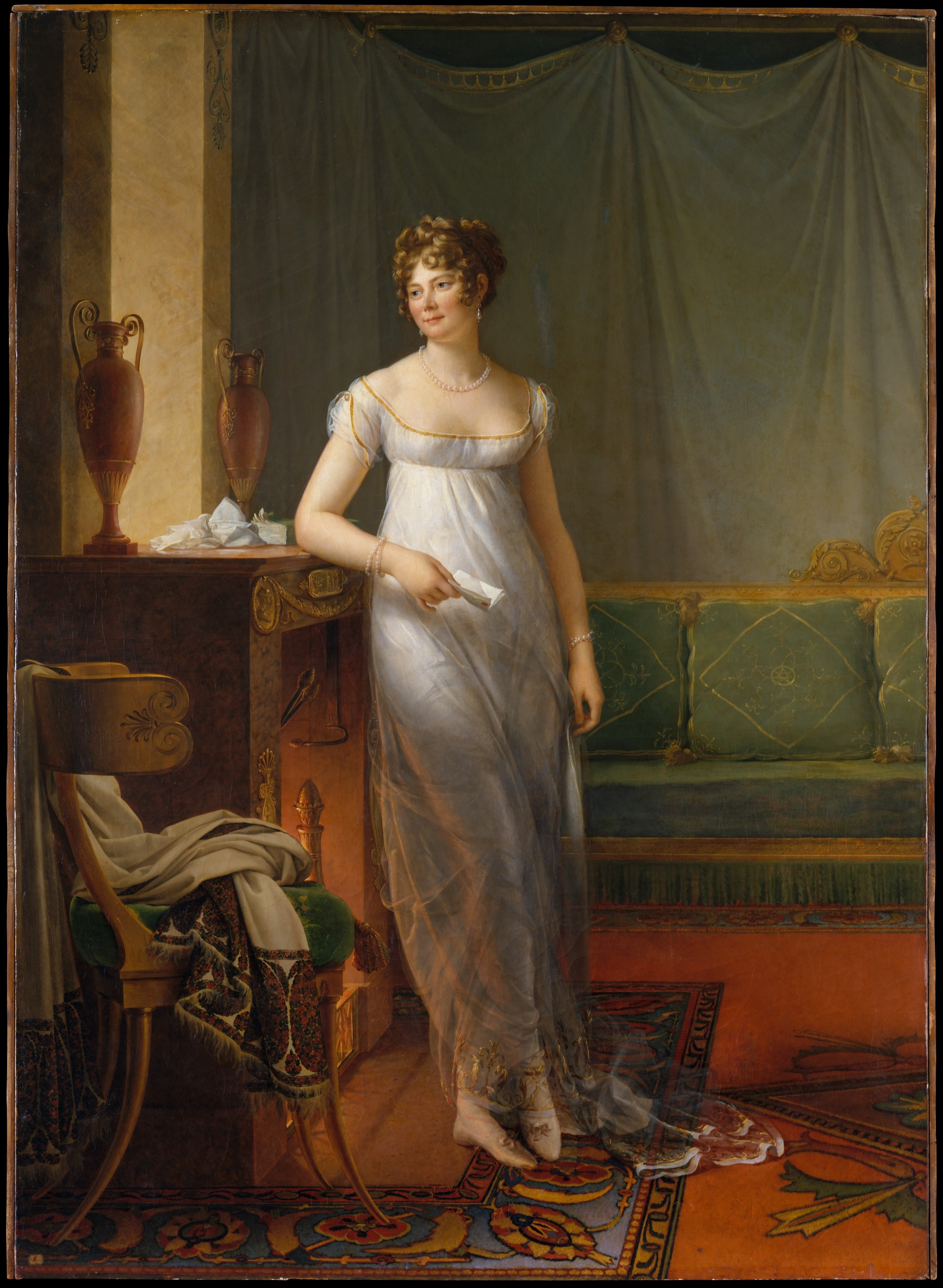
Catherine painted by François Gérard between 1804 and 1805, now at the Metropolitan Museum of Art

Catherine's marriage to George François Grand was annulled in 1798 in absentia and she became Talleyrand's mistress in the same year. The scandal of Talleyrand, a secularized former bishop, living together with his concubine troubled Napoleon Bonaparte, leader of the French First Republic. He issued Talleyrand an ultimatum to either marry Catherine or give her up, hoping to end the relationship. Concerned that Talleyrand meant to abandon her, Catherine forced herself into a diplomatic dinner being hosted by Talleyrand and declared their engagement. Talleyrand was too surprised to contradict her. They were married in a quiet ceremony at Neuilly on 9 September 1802; Napoleon and his first wife Joséphine signed their marriage contract. After marriage, Catherine's relationship with Talleyrand cooled considerably; however, despite his many infidelities, Talleyrand admired her beauty, her docile nature, and her gracious hosting at their homes at Hôtel de Galliffet and Château de Valençay.

The marriage did not change Napoleon's contemptuous attitude toward Catherine. At a reception at the Tuileries Palace soon after her marriage, Napoleon is alleged to have remarked, "I hope that the good conduct of citoyen Talleyrand will cause the fickleness of Madame Grand to be forgotten." Catherine responded by saying, "In that respect, I cannot do better than to follow the example of citoyenne [Joséphine] Bonaparte". The implied rebuke ensured that Catherine was rarely invited to Napoleon's court. Catherine was also disfavoured by Pope Pius VII, who found her background as a courtesan repugnant. He refused to meet her when he attended Napoleon's coronation in 1804, referring to her dismissively as "questa donna" ("this woman").

When Talleyrand was made Prince of Benevento in 1806, Catherine became a princess of Napoleon's First French Empire. In 1808, Napoleon placed the Spanish royal family in the custody of Talleyrand; Catherine was believed to have had a relationship with the Spanish Duke of San Carlos. Catherine was with her husband when they welcomed Tsar Alexander I of Russia to Paris upon Napoleon's downfall in 1814.

=== Separation and death ===
Around the time of the Congress of Vienna in 1815, Talleyrand took the much younger Duchess of Dino as his mistress and Catherine was banished to London. She returned to France in 1817, and settled into a life of quiet luxury from the income she received from Talleyrand and her own ventures. In her later years, Catherine grew obese and vain of her rank of princess. She died in Paris on 10 December 1835, and was buried at Montparnasse Cemetery.
