= Martial Borye Desrenaudes =

French politician

abbé Martial Borye Desrenaudes (1755–1825) was a French politician during the First Republic, under which he served as a Tribune for the year IX (1801). He was a close associate of Talleyrand, and went on to fill many positions in diplomacy and public service during the First Empire and after the Bourbon Restoration, and thus mimicking the career of his better known friend.
