= Assembly of the French clergy =

The assembly of the French clergy (assemblée du clergé de France) was in its origins a representative meeting of the Catholic clergy of France, held every five years, for the purpose of apportioning the financial burdens laid upon the clergy of the French Catholic Church by the kings of France. Meeting from 1560 to 1789, the Assemblies ensured to the clergy an autonomous financial administration, by which they defended themselves against taxation.

== Early history ==
During the Middle Ages the Crusades were the occasions of frequent levies upon ecclesiastical possessions. The Dime Saladine (Saladin Tithe) was inaugurated when Philip II Augustus (1180–1223) united his forces with those of Richard of England to deliver Jerusalem from Saladin. At a later period the contributions of the clergy were increased, and during the reign of Louis IX (1235–70) thirteen subsidies are recorded within twenty-eight years.

== Sixteenth century ==
Francis I of France (1515–48) made incessant calls on the ecclesiastical treasury. The religious wars of the sixteenth century furnished the French kings with pretexts for fresh demands upon the Church.

In 1560, the clergy held a convention at Poissy to consider matters of Church-reform, an occasion made famous by the controversy (Colloque de Poissy) between the Catholic bishops and the Protestant ministers, in which the chief orators were the Cardinal of Lorraine and Theodore Beza. At this assembly the Clergy bound themselves by a contract made in the name of the whole clerical body to pay the king 1,600,000 livres annually for a period of six years; certain estates and taxes that had been pledged to the Hôtel de Ville of Paris for a (yearly) rente, or revenue, of 6,300,000 livres. In other words, the clergy bound themselves to redeem for the king in ten years a capital of 7,560,000 livres. The French monarchs, instead of settling their debts, made fresh loans based on this revenue, paid by the Church, as if it were to be something permanent. After lengthy discussions, the clergy assembled at Melun (1579–80) consented to renew the contract for ten years, a measure destined to be repeated every decade until the French Revolution. The "assemblies of the Clergy" were now an established institution. In this way the Church of France obtained the right of freely meeting and of free speech just when the meetings of the Estates-General (États généraux) were to be discontinued, and the voice of the nation was to be hushed for a period of 200 years.

== Organization ==
At a very early date, these assemblies adopted the form of organization which they were to preserve until the French Revolution. The election of deputies forming the body was arranged according to ecclesiastical provinces. It was decided in 1619 that each province should send four deputies (two bishops and two priests) to the assemblées de contrat held every ten years, and two to the assemblées des comptes which met once during the interval of ten years.

Under this arrangement an assembly was convened every five years. There were two steps in the election of deputies. First, at the diocesan assembly were convened all holders of benefices, a plurality of whose votes elected two delegates. These then proceeded to the metropolitan see, and under the presidency of the metropolitan elected the provincial deputies.

Theoretically, parish priests (curés) might be chosen, but as a matter of fact, by reason of their social station, inferior to that of abbés and canons, they seldom had seats in the assemblies. The rank of subdeacon suffices for election; the Abbé Legendre relates in his memoirs as a contemporary incident that one of these young legislators, after an escapade, was soundly flogged by his perceptor who had accompanied him to Paris. The assemblies at all times reserved to themselves the right of deciding upon the validity of procurators and the authority of deputies. They wished also to reserve the right of electing their own president, whom they always chose from among the bishops. However, to conciliate rivalries, several were usually nominated for the presidency, only one of whom exercised that function.

Under a strong government, withal, and despite the resolution to maintain their right of election, the Assemblies were unlikely to choose a person not in favour at court. During the reign of Louis XIV Harlay de Champvallon, Archbishop of Paris, was several times president. Finally, Saint-Simon writes that the royal displeasure deprived him of his influence with the Clergy, and even shortened his life.

The offices of secretary and "promotor", being looked on by the bishops as somewhat inferior, were assigned to deputies of the second rank, i.e. to priests.

== Commissions ==
The Assemblies of the French Clergy divided their work among commissions. The "Commission of Temporal Affairs" was very important and had an unusually large amount of business to transact. Financial questions, which had given rise to these assemblies, continued to claim their attention until the time of the Revolution. Beginning with the seventeenth century, the payment of the rentes of the Hôtel de Ville was an item of slight importance as compared with the sums which the Clergy were compelled to vote the king under the name of dons gratuits, or free gifts.

== Finance ==
It had been established during the Middle Ages that the Church should contribute not only to the expenses of the Crusades, but also towards the defence of the kingdom, a tradition continued to modern times. The religious wars of the sixteenth century, later the siege of La Rochelle (1628) under Richelieu, and to a still greater extent the political wars waged by Henry IV, Louis XIII, Louis XIV, Louis XV and Louis XVI occasioned the levying of enormous subsidies on the Clergy. The following example may serve as an illustration: the Clergy who had voted sixteen million livres in 1779 gave thirty million more in 1780 for the expenses of the French Government in the war of the American Revolution, to which they added in 1782 sixteen million and in 1786 eighteen million.

The French kings more than once expressed their gratitude to this body for the services it had rendered both monarchy and fatherland in the prompt and generous payment of large subsidies at critical moments. It has been calculated from official documents that during three-quarters of a century (1715-89) the Clergy paid in, either for the rentes of the Hotel de Ville or as "free gifts", over 380 million livres.

When, in 1789, an attempt was made at imposing on the Church of France an equal share of the public expense, the Archbishop of Paris, Monseigneur de Juign', was able to say that the Church already contributed as much as the other orders (nobility, bourgeoisie, and people); its burdens would not be increased by the new law that imposed upon all an equal share in contributing to the expenses of the State.

== Administration ==
The Assemblies of the Clergy conducted their temporal administration carefully. They appointed for ten years a receiver-general (Receveur-général), in reality a minister of finance. The office carried with it a generous salary, and for election to it a two-thirds majority was required. He was bound to furnish security at his residence in Paris and render a detailed account of his management to the assembled Clergy. In each diocese there was a board of elected delegates presided over by the bishop, whose duty it was to apportion the assessments among the beneficed ecclesiastics. This Bureau diocésain de décimes (Diocesan Board of Tithes) was authorized to settle ordinary disputes. Over it were superior boards located at Paris, Lyon, Rouen, Tours, Toulouse, Bordeaux, Aix, and Bourges, courts of appeal, whose decisions were final in all disputes concerning the contributions of the dioceses within their jurisdiction.

In this way the Clergy had an administration of their own, independent of the State, a very important privilege under the old regime. Their credit stood highest; the archives have preserved for us many thousands of rental contracts made in confidence by private individuals with the Church.

It has been said that M. de VillŠle introduced into France the conversion of annuities and the consequent reduction of interest; as a matter of fact this was practised by the Clergy from the end of the seventeenth century, when they were forced to negotiate loans in order to furnish the sums demanded by Louis XIV. Necker, a competent judge, commended the Clergy for the care they took in liquidating these debts. He also praised the clerical system of the distribution of taxes, according to which the beneficed ecclesiastics throughout the kingdom were divided into eight départements, or classes, in order to facilitate the apportionment of taxes in ascending ratio, according to the resources of each. This shows that even under the old regime the Clergy had placed on a practical working basis, in their own system of revenues, the impôt progressif, or system of graduated assessment of income.

On the verge of the Revolution, they accepted the principle that the public burden should be equally divided among all classes of the nation, a step they had delayed too long. Public opinion had already condemned all privileges whatsoever.

== Doctrine ==
The Assemblies of the Clergy did not confine their attention to temporal matters. Doctrinal questions and spiritual matters held an important place among the subjects discussed in them. Indeed, the Colloquy of Poissy, the original germ of the Assemblies, was expressly convened for the discussion of Protestantism, and in opposition to schism and heresy.

Practically every Assembly, from the first in 1560 to the last in 1788, dealt with the problem of Protestantism; their attitude was scarcely favorable to liberty of conscience. In its turn, Jansenism received much attention from these Assemblies, which always supported the papal bulls that condemned it. Indeed, some of the severest measures against Jansenism came from this quarter.

The eighteenth century, with its philosophers and encyclopaedists, brought the Assemblies of the Clergy anxieties of a new and alarming character. They stirred up and encouraged Christian apologists, and urged the king to protect the Church and defend the faith of the French people. They were less successful in this task than in their previous undertakings.

== Assembly of 1682 ==
Four Articles were voted on by the Assembly of 1682, convened to consider the régale, a term denoting the right assumed by the French king during the vacancy of a see to appropriate its revenues and make appointments to benefices. The kings of France had often affirmed that the right of régale belonged to them in virtue of the supremacy of the Crown over all sees. Under Louis XIV, these claims were vigorously enforced. Two prelates, Nicolas Pavillon, Bishop of Alet, and François-Etienne Caulet, Bishop of Pamiers, made a lively resistance to the royal pretensions. The pope sustained them with all his authority. Thereupon the king convoked the Assembly of 1682, presided over by Harley de Champvallon, and Le Tellier, Archbishops respectively of Paris and of Reims. Bossuet, on 9 November 1681, preached in the church on the Grands Augustins at Paris his sermon "On the Unity of the Church". This piece of eloquence was so fortunate as to secure the approbation of both pope and king. Contrary to its custom, the Assembly ordered the discourse to be printed. Thereupon, the question of the régale was quickly decided according to the royal wish.

When Louis XIV asked the Assembly to pronounce upon the authority of the pope, Bossuet tried to temporize and requested that, before proceeding further, Christian tradition on this point be carefully studied. This move proving unsuccessful, the Bishop of Meaux stood out against the Gallican propositions presented in the name of the commission by Choiseul-Praslin, Bishop of Tournai. Thereupon the propositions were turned over to Bossuet himself; he succeeded in eliminating from them the irritating question of appeals to a future council, a proposition several times condemned by the Holy See.

It was then that the Assembly voted (19 March 1682) the "Four Articles" that may be briefly summarized as follows:

- The pope has no right, direct or indirect, over the temporal power of kings.
- The pope is inferior to the General Council, and the decrees of the Council of Constance in its fourth and fifth sessions are still binding.
- The exercise of pontifical authority should be regulated by the ecclesiastical canons.
- Dogmatic decisions of the pope are not irrevocable until they have been confirmed by the judgment of the whole Church.

Bossuet, who was drawn into the discussions in spite of himself, wrote his Defensio Declarationis in justification of the decisions of the Assembly. It was not published, however, until after his death. The king ordered the Four Articles to be promulgated from all the pulpits of France. Pope Innocent XI (1676-89), notwithstanding his dissatisfaction, hesitated to pass censure on the publication of the "Four Articles". He contented himself with expressing his disapproval of the decision made by the Assembly on the question of the régale, and refused the papal Bulls to those members of the Assembly who had been selected by the king for vacant sees.

== Agents-General ==
To lend unity to the action of the Assemblies, and to preserve their influence during the long intervals between these meetings, two ecclesiastics were elected who were thenceforth, as it were, the executive power of the Church of France. They were known as Agents-General (agents-généraux) and were very important personages under the old regime. Although chosen from among the Clergy of the second order, i.e. from among the priests, they were always men of good birth, distinguished bearing, and quite familiar with the ways of the world and the court. They had charge of the accounts of all receivers, protected jealously all rights of the Church, drew attention to whatever was prejudicial to her prerogatives of discipline, and in the parliament represented the ecclesiastical authority and interest in all cases to which the Church was a party. They enjoyed the privilege of committimus, and were specially authorized to enter the king's council and speak before it on ecclesiastical matters. On the occasion of each Assembly these agents rendered an account of their administration in reports, several folio volumes of which have been published since the beginning of the eighteenth century under the title of Rapports d'agence. The usual reward for their services was the episcopate. Their duties prepared them admirably to understand public affairs. Monseigneur de Cicé, Monseigneur de La Luzerne, the Abbé de Montesquiou, and Talleyrand, all of whom played important roles in the Constituent Assembly, had been in their time Agents-General of the Clergy.
