= Charles Maurice de Talleyrand-Périgord =

French secularized clergyman, statesman, and diplomat (1754–1838)

His Serene Highness Charles-Maurice de Talleyrand-Périgord Prince of Talleyrand
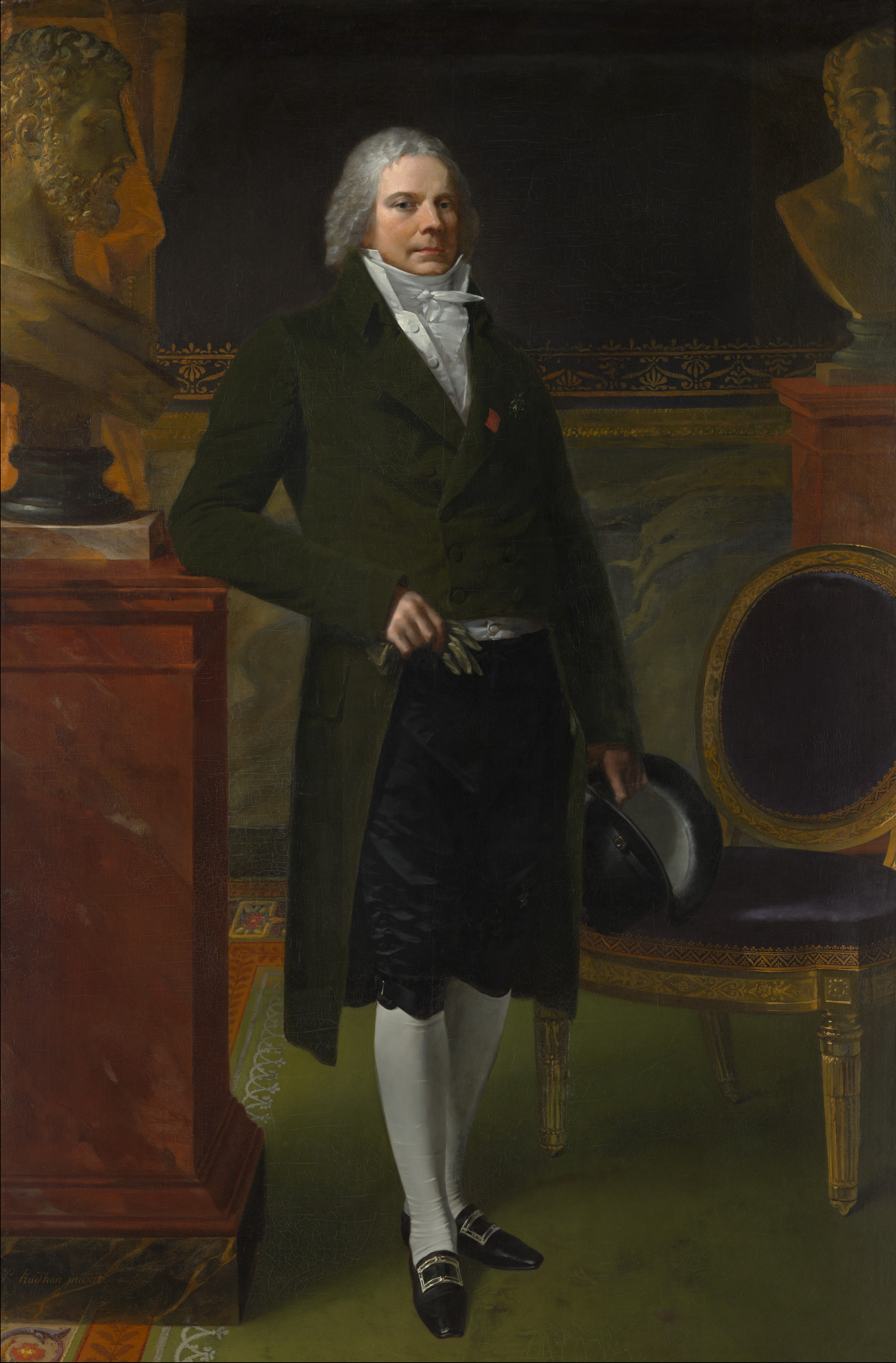
- Portrait by Pierre-Paul Prud'hon (1817)

Ambassador of France to the United Kingdom
- In office 6 September 1830 – 13 November 1834
- Monarch: Louis Philippe I
- Preceded by: Pierre de Montmorency-Laval
- Succeeded by: Horace Sébastiani de La Porta

Prime Minister of France
- In office 9 July 1815 – 26 September 1815
- Monarch: Louis XVIII
- Preceded by: Office established
- Succeeded by: Armand-Emmanuel de Vignerot du Plessis, Duc de Richelieu

First Minister of State of France
- In office 1 April 1814 – 2 May 1814
- Monarch: Louis XVIII
- Preceded by: Napoleon (absolute power)
- Succeeded by: Pierre Louis

President of the French Provisional Government
- In office 1 April 1814 – 13 May 1814
- Preceded by: Napoleon (as emperor)
- Succeeded by: Count of Artois (as steward)

Minister of Foreign Affairs of France
- In office 13 May 1814 – 19 March 1815
- Monarch: Louis XVIII
- Preceded by: Antoine de Laforêt
- Succeeded by: Louis de Caulaincourt
- In office 22 November 1799 – 9 August 1807
- Preceded by: Charles-Frédéric Reinhard
- Succeeded by: Jean-Baptiste de Nompère de Champagny
- In office 15 July 1797 – 20 July 1799
- Preceded by: Charles-François Delacroix
- Succeeded by: Charles-Frédéric Reinhard

Minister of the Navy and the Colonies of France
- In office 7 March 1799 – 2 July 1799
- Preceded by: Étienne Eustache Bruix
- Succeeded by: Marc-Antoine Bourdon de Vatry

President of the National Constituent Assembly of France
- In office 16 February 1790 – 28 February 1790
- Monarch: Louis XVI
- Preceded by: Jean-Xavier Bureau de Pusy
- Succeeded by: François-Xavier-Marc-Antoine de Montesquiou-Fézensac

Member of the National Constituent Assembly
- In office 9 July 1791 – 30 September 1791
- Constituency: Autun

Deputy to the Estates-General for the First Estate
- In office 12 April 1789 – 9 July 1789
- Constituency: Autun

Personal details
- Born: 2 February 1754 Paris, Kingdom of France
- Died: 17 May 1838 (aged 84) Paris, Kingdom of France
- Party: Independent (1789–1799); Bonapartist (1799–1814); Royalist (1814–1815); Doctrinaires (1815–1830)
- Education: Seminary of Saint-Sulpice
- Alma mater: University of Paris
- Profession: Clergyman, politician, diplomat

Ecclesiastical career
- Church: Roman Catholic Church
- Ordained: 19 December 1779 (priest); 4 January 1789 (bishop)
- Laicized: 29 June 1802
- Offices held: Agent-General of the Clergy (1780–1788); Bishop of Autun (1788–1791)

Charles-Maurice de Talleyrand-Périgord (/ˈtælɪrænd ˈpɛrɪɡɔːr/; French: [ʃaʁl mɔʁis də tal(ɛ)ʁɑ̃ peʁiɡɔʁ, moʁ-]; 2 February 1754 – 17 May 1838), 1st Prince of Benevento, then Prince of Talleyrand, was a French secularized clergyman, statesman, and leading diplomat. After studying theology, he became Agent-General of the Clergy in 1780. In 1789, just before the French Revolution, he became Bishop of Autun. He worked at the highest levels of successive French governments, most commonly as foreign minister or in some other diplomatic capacity. He served as the French representative to the Congress of Vienna. His career spanned the regimes of Louis XVI, the years of the French Revolution, Napoleon, Louis XVIII, Charles X, and Louis Philippe I. Those Talleyrand served often distrusted him but found him extremely useful. The name "Talleyrand" has become a byword for crafty and cynical diplomacy.

Talleyrand was Napoleon's chief diplomat during the years when French military victories brought one European state after another under French hegemony. Most of the time, he worked for peace so as to consolidate France's gains. He succeeded in obtaining peace with Austria through the 1801 Treaty of Lunéville and with Britain in the 1802 Treaty of Amiens. He could not prevent the renewal of war in 1803 but by 1805 he opposed his emperor's renewed wars against Austria, Prussia, and Russia. He resigned as foreign minister in August 1807, but retained the trust of Napoleon. He conspired to undermine the emperor's plans through secret dealings with Tsar Alexander I of Russia and the Austrian minister Klemens von Metternich. Talleyrand sought a negotiated secure peace so as to perpetuate the gains of the French Revolution. Napoleon rejected peace; when he fell in 1814, Talleyrand supported the Bourbon Restoration decided by the Allies. He played a major role at the Congress of Vienna in 1814–1815, where he negotiated a favorable settlement for France and played a role in unwinding the Napoleonic Wars.

Talleyrand polarizes opinion. Some regard him as one of the most versatile, skilled, and influential diplomats in European history, with a clear-eyed and realistic view of the French national interest. Others, on the other hand, see him as a serial turncoat seeking only his own advantage, betraying the ancien régime, the French Revolution, and Napoleon in turn for his own gain.

== Early life ==
Talleyrand was born in Paris into an aristocratic family which, though ancient and illustrious, was not particularly prosperous. His father, Count Charles Daniel de Talleyrand-Périgord, was 20 years of age when Charles was born. His mother was Alexandrine de Damas d'Antigny. Both his parents held positions at court, but as the youngest children of their respective families, had no important income. Talleyrand's father had a long career in the French Royal Army, reaching the rank of lieutenant general, as did his uncle, Gabriel Marie de Périgord, despite having the same infirmity from which Talleyrand would suffer throughout his life. His father served all through the Seven Years' War.

From childhood, Talleyrand walked with a limp, which caused him to later be called le diable boiteux (French for "the lame devil") among other nicknames. In his Memoirs, he linked this infirmity to an accident at age four, but recent research has shown that his limp was, in fact, congenital. It might have been a congenital clubfoot. In any case, his handicap made him unable to inherit his father's title, despite being the eldest surviving son. The alternative, chosen for him by his parents, was a career in the Church.

His father held out the hope for Charles-Maurice of succeeding his uncle, Alexandre Angélique de Talleyrand-Périgord, then Archbishop of Reims, one of the richest and most prestigious dioceses in France. At eight years old, Talleyrand attended the Collège d'Harcourt, the seminary of Saint-Sulpice, while studying theology at the Sorbonne until the age of 21. In his free time, he read the works of Montesquieu, Voltaire, and other writers who were beginning to question the authority of the ancien régime in matters of church and state. As subdeacon he witnessed the coronation of Louis XVI at Reims in 1775.

He was not ordained a Catholic priest until four years later, on 19 December 1779, at the age of 25. Very soon, in 1780, he attained the influential position of Agent-General of the Clergy, and was instrumental in promoting the drawing up of a general inventory of Church properties in France as of 1785, along with a defense of "inalienable rights of the Church", the latter being a stance he later denied.

In 1788, the influence of Talleyrand's father and family overcame the King's dislike and obtained his appointment as Bishop of Autun, with a stipend of 22,000 livres. He was consecrated a bishop on 4 January 1789 by Louis-André de Grimaldi. The undoubtedly able Talleyrand, though hardly devout and even free-thinking in the Enlightenment mold, was outwardly respectful of religious observance. In the course of the Revolution, however, he was to manifest his cynicism and abandon all orthodox Catholic practice, resulting in his excommunication by Pope Pius VI on 13 April 1791; he resigned his bishopric immediately and never returned to the Catholic clergy.

On 29 June 1802, Pope Pius VII returned Talleyrand to the lay communion of the church by laicizing him as part of regularizing the status of secular priests who had married during the Revolution.

== French Revolution ==
Shortly after he was consecrated as Bishop of Autun, Talleyrand attended the Estates-General of 1789, representing the clergy, the First Estate. During the French Revolution, Talleyrand strongly supported the anti-clericalism of the revolutionaries. Along with Mirabeau, he promoted the appropriation of Church properties. He participated in the writing of the Declaration of the Rights of Man and of the Citizen and proposed both the Decree on the goods of the clergy placed at the disposal of the Nation in 1789 and the Civil Constitution of the Clergy that nationalized the Church in preference to allegiance to the Pope. He also swore in the first four constitutional bishops, even though he had himself resigned as bishop following his excommunication.

During the Fête de la Fédération on 14 July 1790, Talleyrand celebrated Mass. Notably, he promoted public education in full spirit of the Enlightenment by preparing a 216-page Report on Public Instruction. It proposed pyramidical structure rising through local, district, and departmental schools, and parts were later adopted. During his 5-month tenure in the Estates-General, Talleyrand was also involved in drawing up the police regulations of Paris, proposed the suffrage of Jews, supported a ban on the tithes, and invented a method to ensure loans. Few bishops followed him in obedience to the new decree, and much of the French clergy came to view him as schismatic.

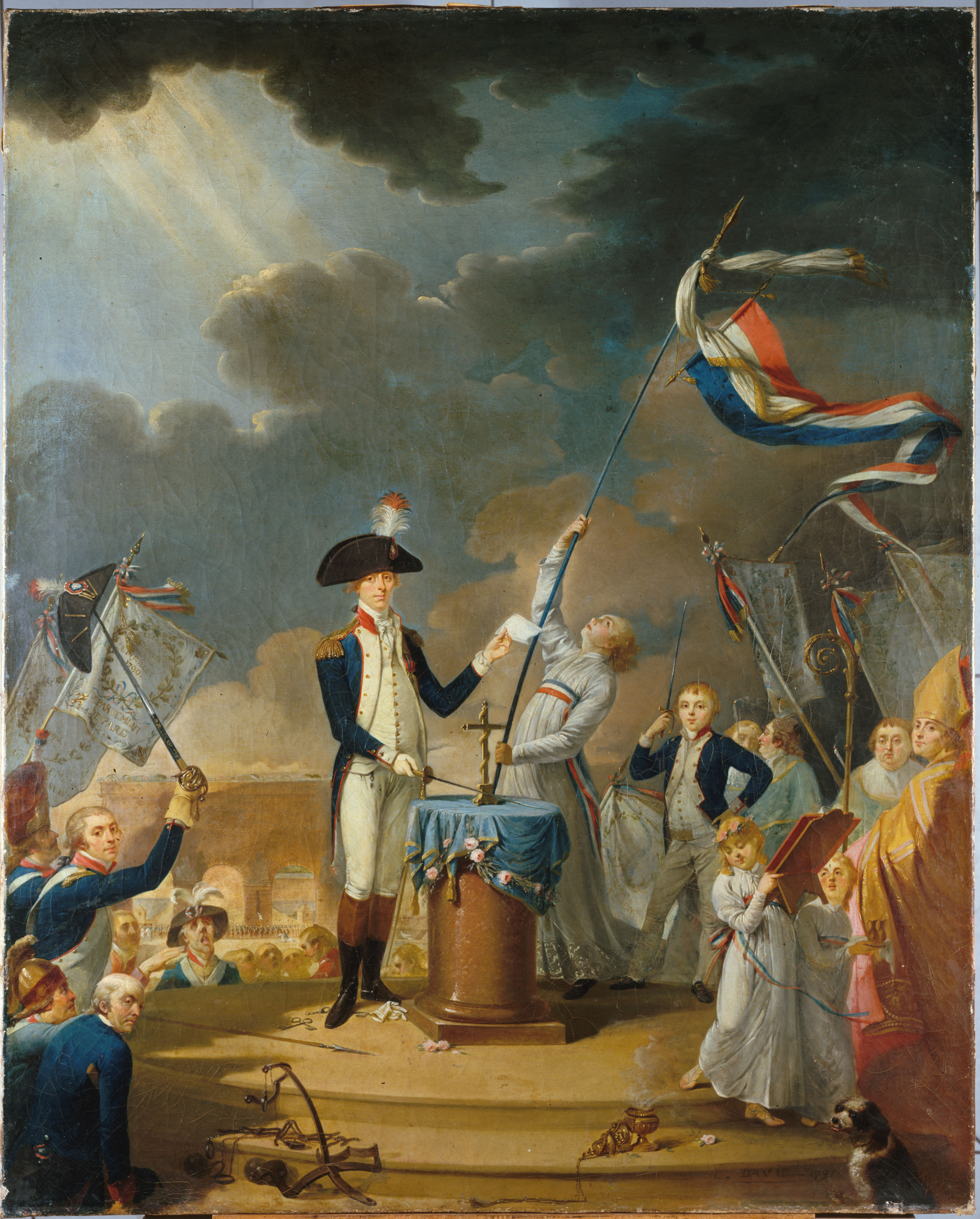
The oath of La Fayette at the Fête de la Fédération, 14 July 1790. Talleyrand, then Bishop of Autun, can be seen at the extreme right. French School, 18th century. Musée Carnavalet.

Just before his resignation from the bishopric, Talleyrand had been elected, with Mirabeau and the Abbé Sieyès, as a Member of the department of Paris. In that capacity he did useful work for some eighteen months in seeking to support the cause of order in the turbulent capital. Though he was often on strained terms with Mirabeau, his views generally coincided with those of that statesman, who before he died is said to have advised Talleyrand to develop a close understanding with England.

In 1792, Talleyrand was sent twice, unofficially, to London to avert war, and he was cordially received by Pitt and Grenville. After his first visit, he persuaded the then foreign minister, Charles François Dumouriez, of the importance of having a fully accredited ambassador in London, and the marquis de Chauvelin was duly appointed, with Talleyrand as his deputy. Still, after an initial British declaration of neutrality during the first campaigns of 1792, his mission ultimately failed. In September 1792, just at the beginning of the September massacres, he left Paris for England, having acquired a passport from Danton personally.

The National Convention issued a warrant for Talleyrand's arrest in December 1792. In March 1794, with the two countries at the brink of war, he was forced to leave Britain by Pitt's expulsion order. He then went to the neutral country of the United States. The ship he took to the US was forced by rough weather in the Channel to stop at Falmouth where Talleyrand recounts an awkward chance meeting with Benedict Arnold at an inn. During Talleyrand's stay in the US, he supported himself by working as a bank agent, involved in commodity trading and real estate speculation. He was a house guest of Aaron Burr of New York and collaborated with Theophile Cazenove in Philadelphia. On 19 May 1794, Matthew Clarkson, the mayor of Philadelphia, received his oath. Talleyrand swore "that I will be faithful and bear true allegiance to...the United States of America... " Burr later sought similar refuge in Talleyrand's home during his self-imposed European exile (1808–12). However, Talleyrand would refuse to return the favor because Burr had killed Talleyrand's friend Alexander Hamilton in an 1804 duel.

Talleyrand returned to France in 1796. After 9 Thermidor, he mobilized his friends (most notably the abbé Martial Borye Desrenaudes and Germaine de Staël) to lobby in the National Convention and the newly established Directoire for his return. His name was suppressed from the émigré list and he returned to France on 25 September 1796. After gaining attention by giving addresses on the value of commercial relations with England, and of colonization as a way of renewing the nation, he became Foreign Minister in July 1797. He was behind the demand for bribes in the XYZ Affair which escalated into the Quasi-War, an undeclared naval war with the United States, 1798–1800. Talleyrand saw a possible political career for Napoleon during the Italian campaigns of 1796 to 1797. He wrote many letters to Napoleon, and the two became close allies. Talleyrand was against the destruction of the Republic of Venice, but he complimented Napoleon when the Treaty of Campo Formio with Austria was concluded (Venice was given to Austria), probably because he wanted to reinforce his alliance with Napoleon. Later in 1797, Talleyrand was instrumental in assisting with the Coup of 18 Fructidor, which ousted two moderate members of the Directory in favor of the Jacobins headed by Paul Barras. He was also an early advocate of the Expedition to Egypt.

== Under Napoleon ==
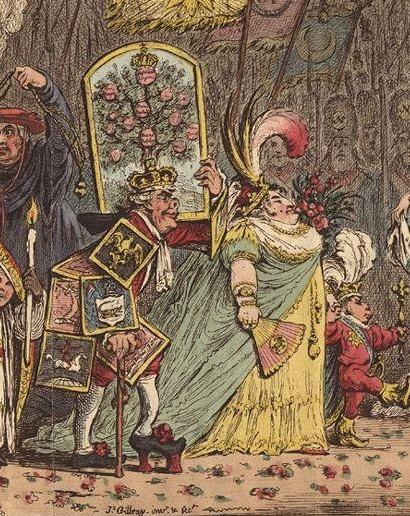
Detail of a caricature of Napoleon I's coronation, depicting Talleyrand (left) and his wife Catherine (right) by James Gillray (1805)

Talleyrand, along with Napoleon's younger brother, Lucien Bonaparte, was instrumental in the 1799 coup d'état of 18 Brumaire, establishing the French Consulate government, although he also made preparations for flight if necessary. He also persuaded Barras to resign as Director. Talleyrand was soon made Foreign Minister by Napoleon, although he rarely agreed with Napoleon's foreign policy. Domestically, Talleyrand used his influence to help in the repeal of the strict laws against émigrés, refractory clergy, and the royalists of the west.

The Pope released him from the ban of excommunication in the Concordat of 1801, which also revoked the Civil Constitution of the Clergy. Talleyrand was instrumental in the completion of the Treaty of Amiens in 1802. He wanted Napoleon to keep peace afterwards, as he thought France had reached its maximum expansion. Talleyrand was an integral player in the German mediatization. While the Treaty of Campo Formio of 1797 had, on paper, stripped German princes of their lands beyond the left bank of the Rhine, it was not enforced until the Treaty of Lunéville in 1801. As the French annexed these lands, leaders believed that rulers of states such as Baden, Bavaria, Württemberg, Prussia, Hesse and Nassau, who lost territories on the Left Bank, should receive new territories on the Right Bank through the secularization of ecclesiastical principalities. Many of these rulers gave out bribes in order to secure new lands, and Talleyrand and some of his associates amassed about 10 million francs in the process. This was the first blow in the destruction of the Holy Roman Empire.

While helping to establish French supremacy in neighboring states and assisting Bonaparte in securing the title of First Consul for life, Talleyrand sought all means of securing the permanent welfare of France. He worked hard to prevent the rupture of the peace of Amiens which occurred in May 1803, and he did what he could to prevent the Louisiana Purchase earlier in the year. These events, as he saw, told against the best interests of France and endangered the gains which she had secured by war and diplomacy. Thereafter he strove to moderate Napoleon's ambition and to preserve the European system as far as possible. A more ruthless side of Talleyrand's character comes through however, in his role regarding the apprehension and execution of the Bourbon Duke of Enghien.

Napoleon forced Talleyrand into marriage in September 1802 to longtime mistress Catherine Grand (née Worlée). Talleyrand purchased the Château de Valençay in May 1803, upon the urging of Napoleon. This later was used as the site of imprisonment of the Spanish royal family in 1808–1813, after Napoleon's invasion of Spain. In May 1804, Napoleon bestowed upon Talleyrand the title of Grand Chamberlain of the Empire, with almost 500,000 francs a year. In 1806, he was made Sovereign Prince of Benevento (or Bénévent), a former Papal fief in southern Italy. Talleyrand held the title until 1815 and administered the principality concurrently with his other tasks.

Talleyrand was opposed to the harsh treatment of Austria in the 1805 Treaty of Pressburg and of Prussia in the Peace of Tilsit in 1807. In 1806, after Pressburg, he profited greatly from the reorganization of the German lands, this time into the Confederation of the Rhine. He negotiated the Treaty of Posen with Saxony, but was shut out completely from the negotiations at Tilsit. After Queen Louise of Prussia failed in her appeal to Napoleon to spare her nation, she wept and was consoled by Talleyrand. This gave him a good name among the elites of European nations outside France.

== Changing sides ==
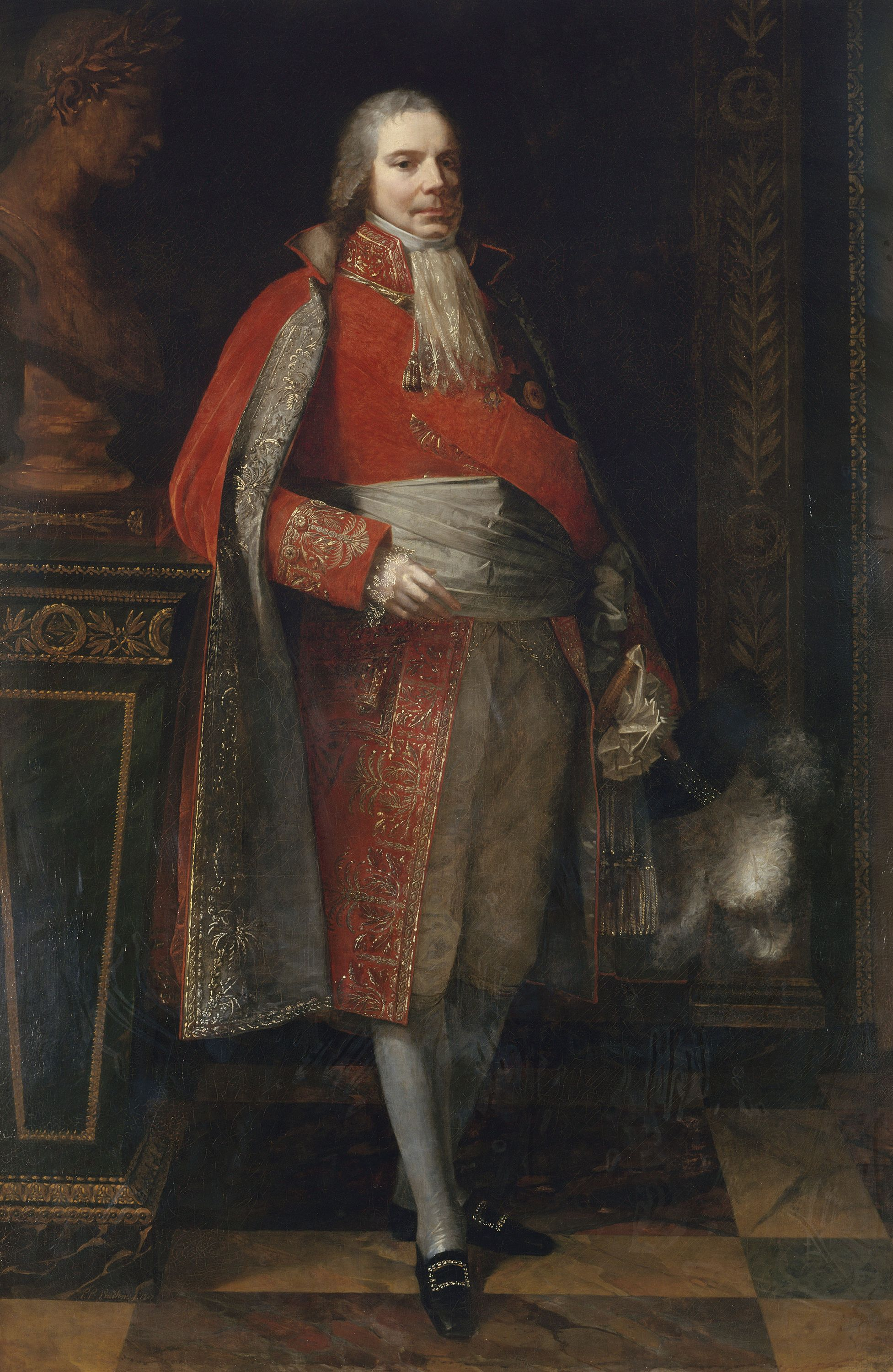
Portrait of Talleyrand as Grand Chamberlain of France by Pierre-Paul Prud'hon, 1807

Having wearied of serving a master in whom he no longer had much confidence, Talleyrand resigned as minister of foreign affairs in 1807, although the Emperor retained him in the Council of State as Vice-Grand Elector of the Empire. Although Talleyrand claimed to have always been opposed to the French military occupation in Iberia, which resulted in the Peninsular War beginning in 1808, evidence exists that he was initially an advocate of toppling the Spanish Bourbons but later tried to distance himself from this policy. At the Congress of Erfurt in September–October 1808, Talleyrand secretly counseled Tsar Alexander. The Tsar's attitude towards Napoleon was one of apprehensive opposition. Talleyrand repaired the confidence of the Russian monarch, who rebuked Napoleon's attempts to form a direct anti-Austrian military alliance. Napoleon had expected Talleyrand to help convince the Tsar to accept his proposals and never discovered that Talleyrand was working at cross-purposes. Talleyrand believed Napoleon would eventually destroy the empire he had worked to build across multiple rulers.

After his resignation in 1807 from the ministry, Talleyrand began to accept bribes from hostile powers (mainly Austria, but also Russia), to betray Napoleon's secrets. Talleyrand and Joseph Fouché, who were typically enemies in both politics and the salons, had a rapprochement in late 1808 and entered into discussions over the imperial line of succession. Napoleon had yet to address this matter and the two men knew that without a legitimate heir a struggle for power would erupt in the wake of Napoleon's death. Even Talleyrand, who believed that Napoleon's policies were leading France to ruin, understood the necessity of peaceful transitions of power. Napoleon received word of their actions and deemed them treasonous. This perception caused the famous dressing down of Talleyrand in front of Napoleon's marshals, during which Napoleon famously claimed that he could "break him like a glass, but it's not worth the trouble" and added with a scatological tone that Talleyrand was "shit in a silk stocking", to which the minister coldly retorted, once Napoleon had left, "Pity that so great a man should have been so badly brought up!"

Talleyrand opposed the further harsh treatment of Austria in 1809 after the War of the Fifth Coalition. He was also a critic of the French invasion of Russia in 1812. He was invited to resume his former office in late 1813, but Talleyrand could see that power was slipping from Napoleon's hands. He offered to resign from the council in early 1814, but Napoleon refused the move. Talleyrand then hosted the tsar at the end of March after the fall of Paris, persuaded him that the best chance of stability lay with the House of Bourbon, and gained his support. On 1 April 1814, he led the Sénat conservateur in establishing a provisional government in Paris, of which he was elected president. On 2 April the Senate officially deposed Napoleon with the Acte de déchéance de l'Empereur; by 11 April, it had approved the Treaty of Fontainebleau and adopted a new constitution to re-establish the Bourbon monarchy.

== Bourbon Restoration and July Monarchy ==
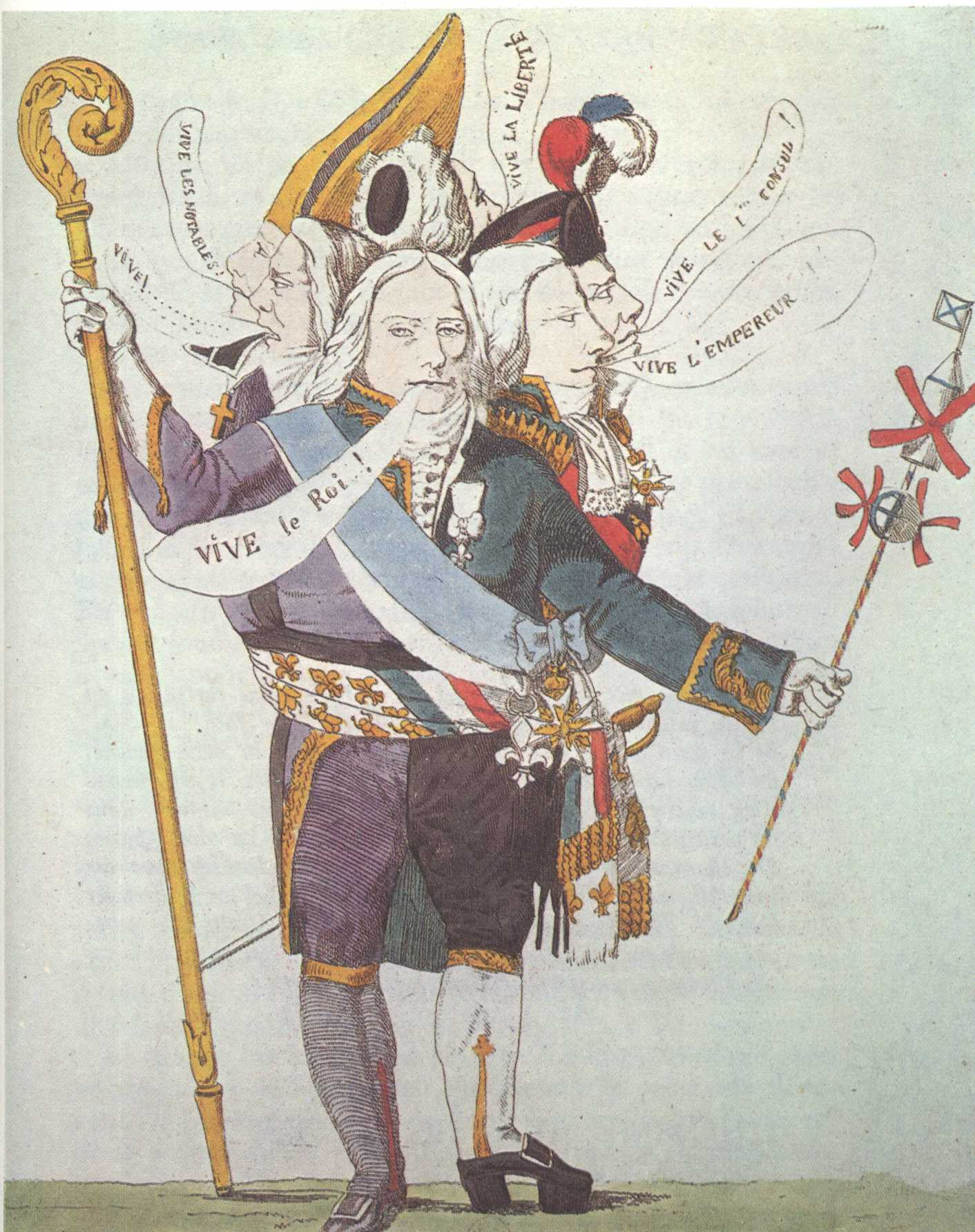
An 1815 caricature of Talleyrand – L'Homme aux six têtes (The man with six heads), referring to his prominent role in six different regimes

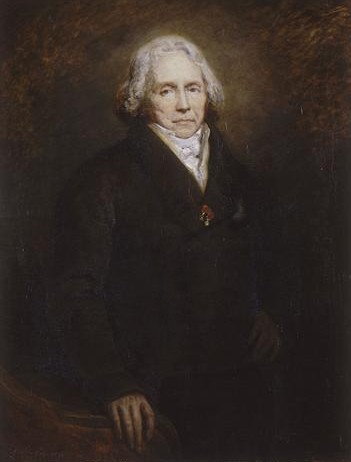
Elderly Talleyrand, 1828 by Ary Scheffer

When Napoleon was succeeded by Louis XVIII in April 1814, Talleyrand was one of the key agents of the restoration of the House of Bourbon, although he opposed the new legislation of Louis's rule. Talleyrand was the chief French negotiator at the Congress of Vienna; earlier that same year he signed the Treaty of Paris. It was due in part to his skills that the terms of the treaty were remarkably lenient towards France. As the Congress opened, the right to make decisions was restricted to four countries: Austria, the United Kingdom, Prussia and Russia. France and other European countries were invited to attend, but were not allowed to influence the process. Talleyrand promptly became the champion of the small countries and demanded admission into the ranks of the decision-making process. The four powers admitted France and Spain to the decision-making backrooms of the conference after a good deal of diplomatic maneuvering by Talleyrand, who had the support of the Spanish representative, Pedro Gómez Labrador, Marquis of Labrador. Spain was excluded after a while (a result of both the Marquis of Labrador's incompetence as well as the quixotic nature of Spain's agenda), but France (Talleyrand) was allowed to participate until the end. Russia and Prussia sought to enlarge their territory at the Congress. Russia demanded annexation of Poland (already occupied by Russian troops); this demand was finally satisfied, despite protests by France, Austria and the United Kingdom. Austria was afraid of future conflicts with Russia or Prussia and the United Kingdom was opposed to their expansion as well—and Talleyrand managed to take advantage of these contradictions within the former anti-French coalition. On 3 January 1815, a secret treaty was signed by France's Talleyrand, Austria's Metternich and Britain's Castlereagh. By this tract, officially a secret treaty of defensive alliance, the three powers agreed to use force if necessary to "repulse aggression" (of Russia and Prussia) and to protect the "state of security and independence".

Talleyrand, having managed to establish a middle position, received some favors from the other countries in exchange for his support: France returned to its 1792 boundaries without reparations, with French control over the papal Comtat Venaissin, County of Montbéliard, and Salm, which had been independent at the start of the French Revolution in 1789. It would later be debated which outcome would have been better for France: allowing Prussia to annex all of Saxony (Talleyrand ensured that only part of the kingdom would be annexed) or the Rhine provinces. The first option would have kept Prussia farther away from France, but would have needed much more opposition as well. Some historians have argued that Talleyrand's diplomacy wound up establishing the fault lines of World War I, especially as it allowed Prussia to engulf small German states west of the Rhine. This simultaneously placed the Prussian Army at the French-German frontier, for the first time; made Prussia the largest German power in terms of territory, population and the industry of the Ruhr and Rhineland; and eventually helped pave the way to German unification under the Prussian throne. However, at the time Talleyrand's diplomacy was regarded as successful, as it removed the threat of France being partitioned by the victors. Talleyrand also managed to strengthen his own position in France (ultraroyalists had disapproved of the presence of a former "revolutionary" and "murderer of the Duke d'Enghien" in the royal cabinet).

Napoleon's return to France in 1815 and his subsequent defeat, the Hundred Days, was a reverse for the diplomatic victories of Talleyrand (who remained in Vienna the whole time). The second peace settlement was markedly less lenient and it was fortunate for France that the business of the Congress had been concluded. Having been appointed foreign minister and president of the council on 9 July 1815, Talleyrand resigned in September of that year, over his objections to the second treaty. Louis XVIII appointed him as the Grand Chamberlain of France, a mostly ceremonial role which provided Talleyrand with a steady income. For the next fifteen years he restricted himself to the role of "elder statesman", criticizing and intriguing against Minister of Police Élie, duc Decazes, Prime Minister Duc de Richelieu and other political opponents from the sidelines. In celebration of the birth of the Duc de Bordeaux, Louis XVIII made Talleyrand a knight of the Order of the Holy Spirit.

In December 1829, Talleyrand funded the foundation of the National newspaper. The newspaper was run by his personal friend Adolphe Thiers, alongside Armand Carrel, François Mignet and Stendhal. Its first issue appeared on 3 January 1830, quickly becoming the mouthpiece of the Orléanist cause and gaining popularity among the French liberal bourgeoisie. Following the ascent of Louis-Philippe I to the throne in the aftermath of the July Revolution of 1830, Talleyrand reluctantly agreed to become ambassador to the United Kingdom, a post he held from 1830 to 1834. In this role, he strove to reinforce the legitimacy of Louis-Philippe's regime. He played a vital role in the London Conference of 1830, rebuking a partition plan developed by his son Charles de Flahaut and helping bring Leopold of Saxe-Coburg to the throne of the newly independent Kingdom of Belgium. In April 1834, he crowned his diplomatic career by signing the treaty which brought together as allies France, Great Britain, Spain, and Portugal.

After resigning from his position as ambassador in London in November 1834, Talleyrand stopped playing an active role in French politics. He split his time between Château de Valençay and Saint-Florentin, where he hosted frequent banquets and played whist with his visitors. His physical health began to steadily deteriorate and he began using an armchair on wheels provided to him by Louis Philippe I. He spent most of his time in the company of the Duchess Dino and concerned himself with the education of her daughter Pauline. Talleyrand suffered from bouts of recurring depression which were caused by his concern over his legacy and the development of the Napoleonic myth. To that end he ordered that his autobiography, the Memoirs, be published 30 years after his death. He also sought to gain the friendship of people he believed would shape public opinion in the future, including Honoré de Balzac, Lady Granville and Alphonse de Lamartine. During the last years of his life Talleyrand began planning his reconciliation with the Catholic Church. On 16 May 1838, he signed a retraction of his errors towards the church and a letter of submission to Pope Gregory XVI. He died the following day at 3:55 p.m., at Saint-Florentin.

By a codicil added to his will on 17 March 1838, Talleyrand left his memoirs and papers to the duchess of Dino and Adolphe de Bacourt. The latter revised them with care, and added to them other pieces emanating from Talleyrand. They fell into some question: first that Talleyrand is known to have destroyed many of his most important papers, and secondly that de Bacourt almost certainly drew up the connected narrative which we now possess from notes which were in more or less of confusion. The mémoires were later edited by the duc de Broglie and published in 1891.

== Private life ==
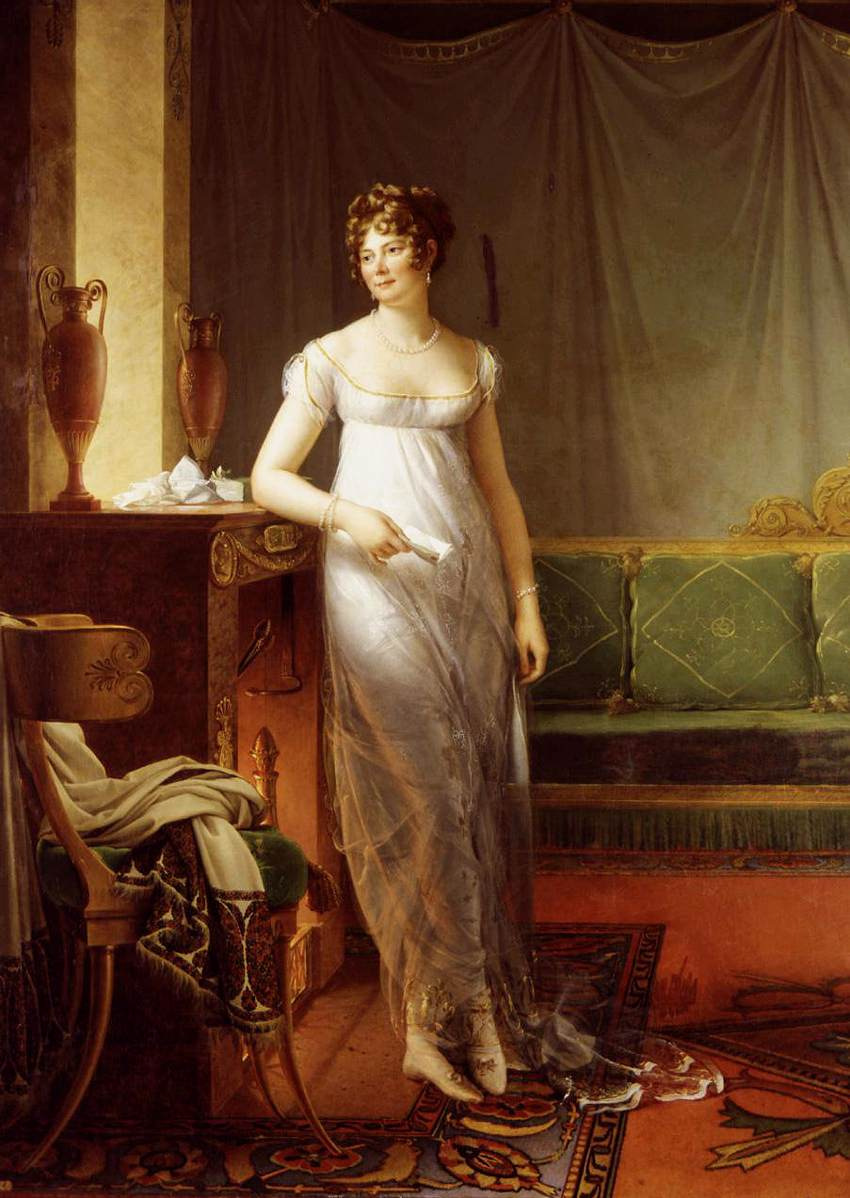
Catherine (Worlée) Grand, princesse de Talleyrand-Périgord, painted by François Gérard 1805–06

Talleyrand had a reputation for promiscuity and as a voluptuary. He left no legitimate children, though he possibly fathered over two dozen illegitimate ones. Four possible children of his have been identified: Charles Joseph, comte de Flahaut, generally accepted to be an illegitimate son of Talleyrand; the painter Eugène Delacroix, once rumoured to be Talleyrand's son, though this is doubted by historians who have examined the issue (for example, Léon Noël, French ambassador); the "Mysterious Charlotte", possibly his daughter by his future wife, Catherine Worlée Grand; and Pauline, ostensibly the daughter of the Duke and Duchess Dino. Of these four, only the first is given credence by historians. However, the French historian Emmanuel de Waresquiel has lately given much credibility to father-daughter link between Talleyrand and Pauline whom he referred to as "my dear Minette". Thaddeus Stevens "suffered too from the rumor that he was actually the bastard son of Count Talleyrand, who was said to have visited New England in the year before Stevens' birth. ... Actually Talleyrand did not visit New England till 1794, when Stevens was already two years old."

Aristocratic women were a key component of Talleyrand's political tactics, both for their influence and their ability to cross borders unhindered. His presumed lover Germaine de Staël was a major influence on him, and he on her. Though their personal philosophies were most different (she a romantic, he very much unsentimental), she assisted him greatly, most notably by lobbying Barras to permit Talleyrand to return to France from his American exile, and then to have him made foreign minister. He lived with Catherine Worlée, born in India and married there to Charles Grand. She had traveled about before settling in Paris in the 1780s, where she lived as a notorious courtesan for several years before divorcing Grand to marry Talleyrand. Talleyrand was in no hurry to marry, and it was after repeated postponements that Napoleon obliged him in 1802 to formalize the relationship or risk his political career. While serving as a high level negotiator at the Congress of Vienna (1814–1815), Talleyrand entered into an arrangement with Dorothea von Biron, the wife of his nephew, the Duke of Dino. Shortly after, he separated from Catherine.

Talleyrand's venality was notorious even by the standards of that time; in the tradition of the ancien régime, he expected to be paid for the state duties he performed—whether these can properly be called "bribes" is open to debate. For example, during the German mediatization, the consolidation of the small German states, a number of German rulers and elites paid him to save their possessions or enlarge their territories. Less successfully, he solicited payments from the United States government to open negotiations, precipitating a diplomatic disaster (the "XYZ Affair"). The difference between his diplomatic success in Europe and failure with the United States illustrates that his diplomacy rested firmly on the power of the French army that was a terrible threat to the German states within reach, but lacked the logistics to threaten the US not the least because of the British naval domination of the seas. After Napoleon's defeat, he withdrew claims to the title "Prince of Benevento", but was created Duke of Talleyrand with the style "Prince de Talleyrand" for life, in the same manner as his estranged wife.

Described by biographer Philip Ziegler as a "pattern of subtlety and finesse" and a "creature of grandeur and guile", Talleyrand was a great conversationalist, gourmet, and wine connoisseur. He was a frequent visitor at the salon hosted by Adèle de Bellegarde and her sister Aurore, with whom he dined regularly over a period of five years. From 1801 to 1804, he owned Château Haut-Brion in Bordeaux. In 1803, Napoleon ordered Talleyrand to acquire the Château de Valençay as a place particularly appropriate for reception of foreign dignitaries, and Talleyrand made it his primary place of residence until his death in 1838. There he employed the renowned French chef Marie-Antoine Carême, one of the first celebrity chefs known as the "chef of kings and king of chefs", and was said to have spent an hour every day with him. His Paris residence on the Place de la Concorde, acquired in 1812 and sold to James Mayer de Rothschild in 1838, is now owned by the Embassy of the United States. Talleyrand has been regarded as a traitor because of his support for successive regimes, some of which were mutually hostile. According to French philosopher Simone Weil, criticism of his loyalty is unfounded, as Talleyrand served not every regime as had been said, but in reality "France behind every regime".

Near the end of his life, Talleyrand became interested in Catholicism again while teaching his young granddaughter simple prayers. The Abbé Félix Dupanloup came to Talleyrand in his last hours, and according to his account Talleyrand made confession and received extreme unction. When the abbé tried to anoint Talleyrand's palms, as prescribed by the rite, he turned his hands over to make the priest anoint him on the back of the hands, since he was a cleric. He also signed, in the abbé's presence, a solemn declaration in which he openly disavowed "the great errors which … had troubled and afflicted the Catholic, Apostolic and Roman Church, and in which he himself had had the misfortune to fall." He died on 17 May 1838 and was buried in the Notre-Dame Chapel, near his Château de Valençay. Today, when speaking of the art of diplomacy, the phrase "they are a Talleyrand" is variously used to describe a statesman of great resourcefulness and craft, or a cynical and conscienceless self-serving politician.

== Honors ==
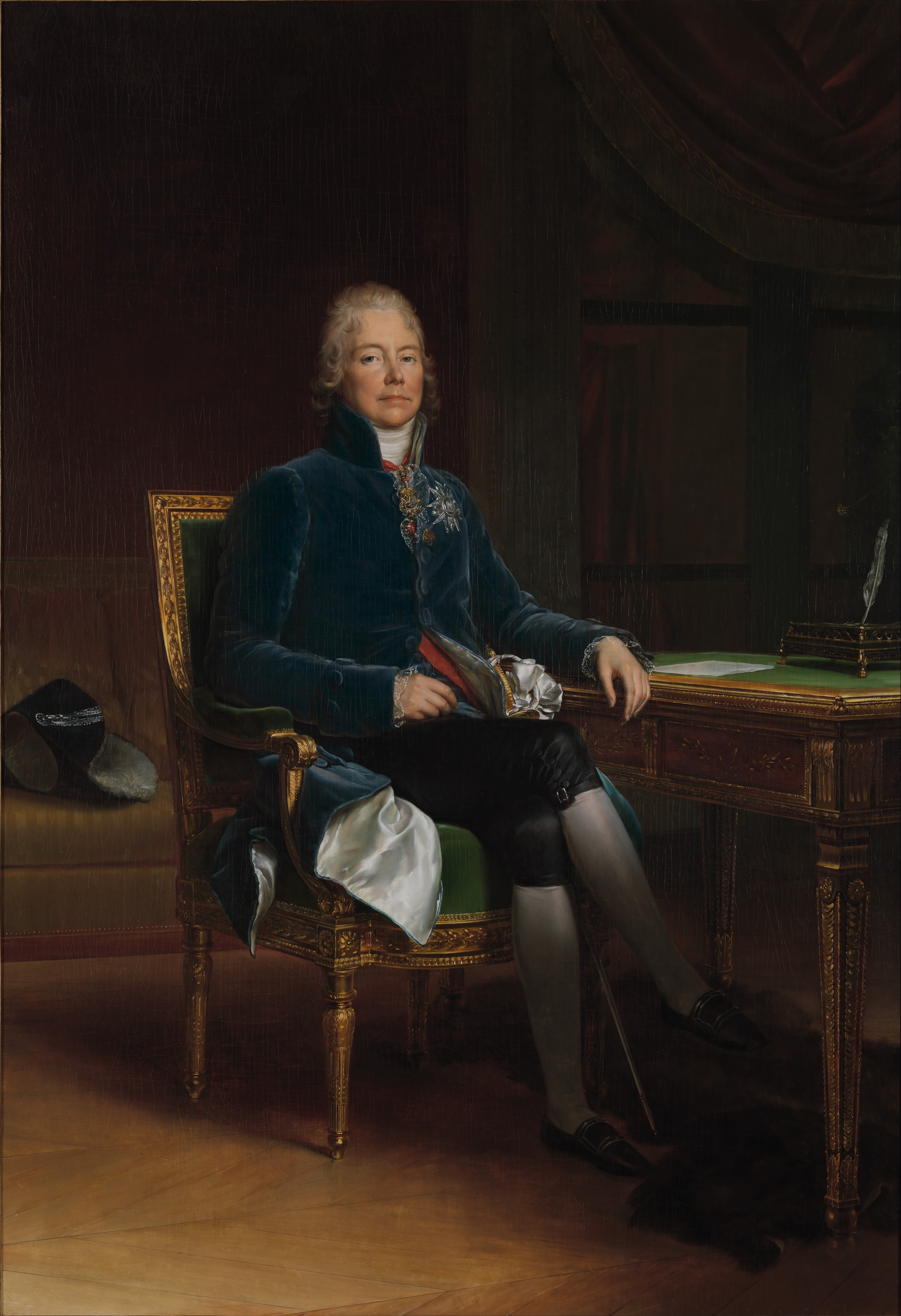
Portrait of Talleyrand by François Gérard (1808)

- Pair de France.
- Knight Grand Cross in the Legion of Honour
- Knight of the Order of the Holy Spirit
- Knight of the Order of the Golden Fleece of Spain
- Knight Grand Cross of the Order of St. Stephen of Hungary.
- Knight Grand Cross of the Order of Saint Andrew.
- Knight Grand Cross of the Order of the Red Eagle.
- Knight Grand Cross of the Order of the Black Eagle.
- Knight of the Order of the Elephant.
- Knight of the Order of Saint Hubert.
- Knight Grand Cross of the Order of the Sun.
- Knight Grand Cross of the Order of the Crown of Saxony.
- Member of the American Philosophical Society (elected 1796).

== Gallery ==
Arms of Talleyrand under the Napoleonic Empire

Arms of Talleyrand under the Bourbon Restoration

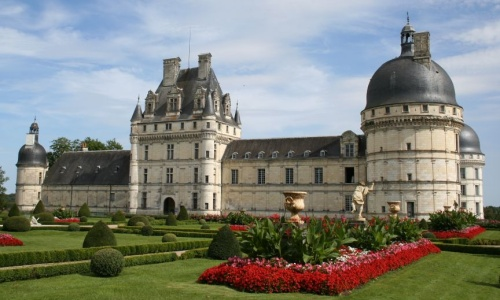
Château de Valençay

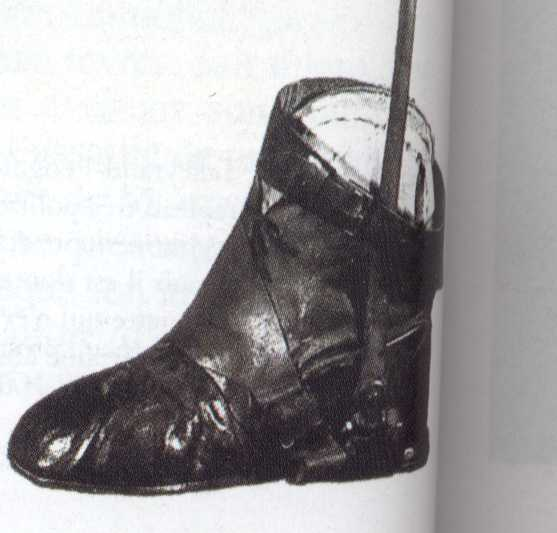
Talleyrand's orthopedic shoe, now in the Château de Valençay

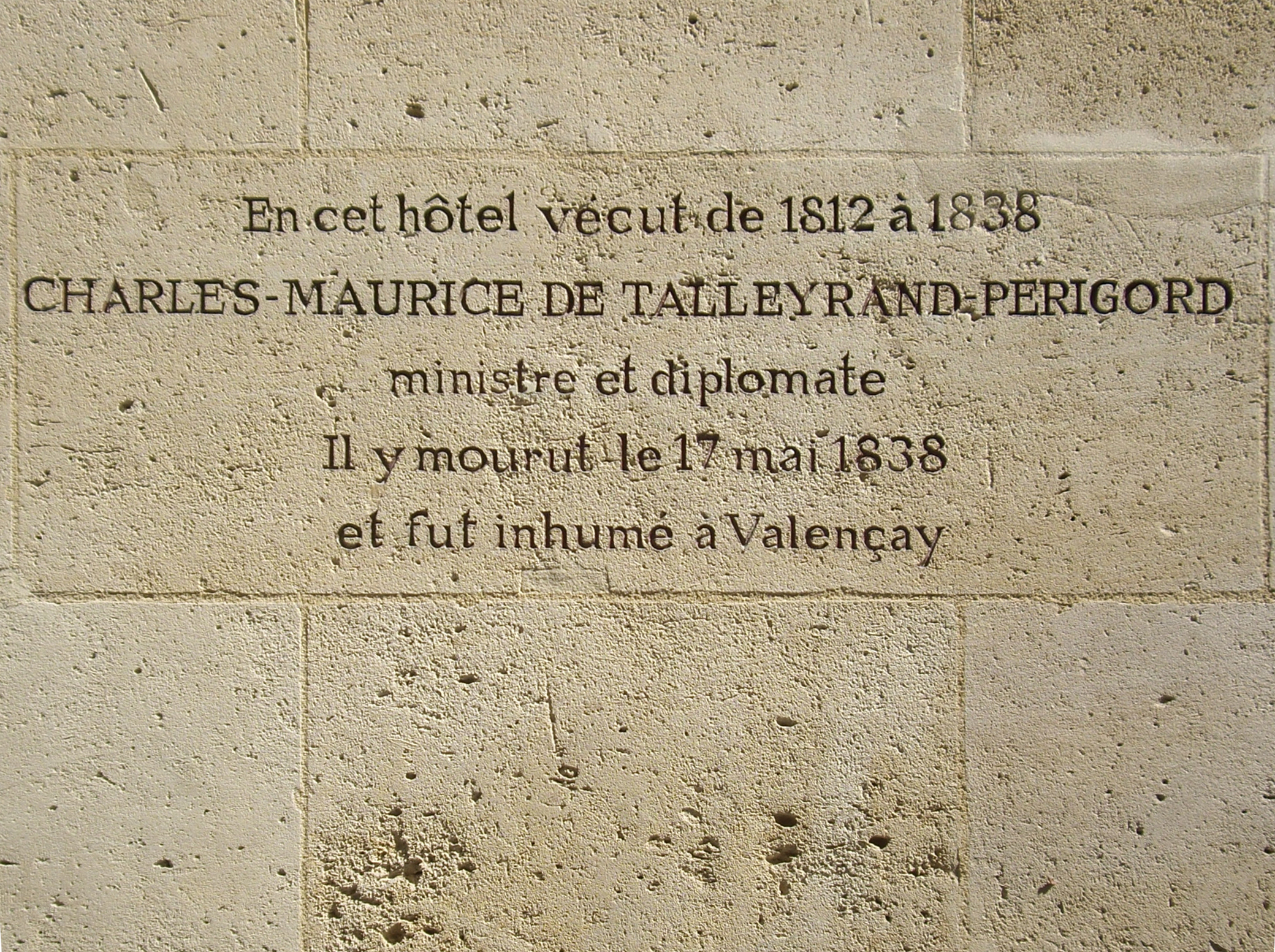
Inscription at the Hôtel de Saint-Florentin

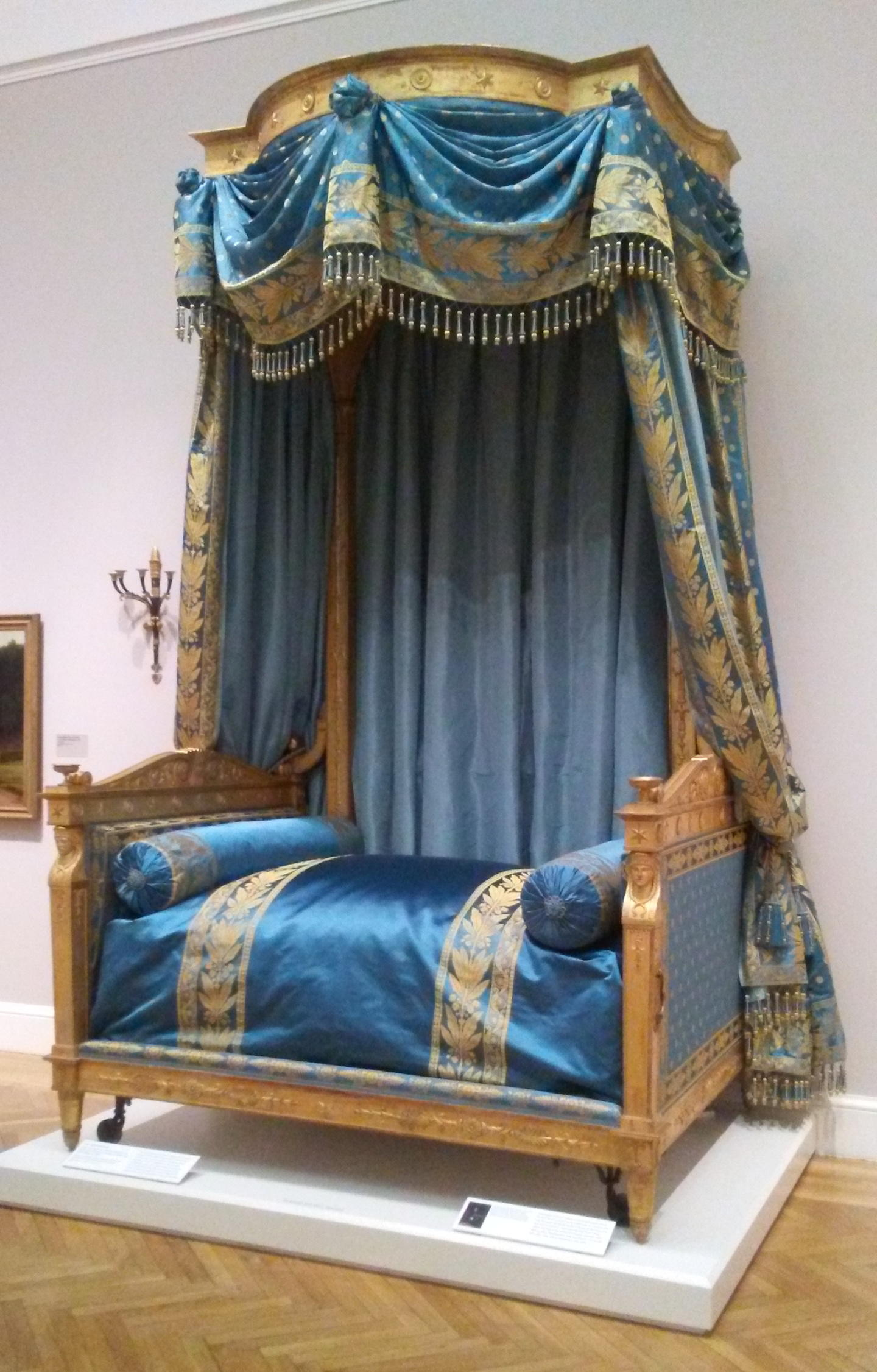
Empire style state bed (lit de parade) made for Talleyrand, c. 1805

Catholic Church titles
Preceded by Pierre-Louis de La Rochefoucauld	Agent-General of the French Clergy; 1780–1785; Served alongside: Thomas de Boisgelin	Succeeded by François-Xavier-Marc-Antoine de Montesquiou-Fézensac
Preceded by Louis de Jarente de Sénas d'Orgeval	Agent-General of the French Clergy; 1780–1785; Served alongside: Thomas de Boisgelin	Succeeded by Louis-Mathias
Preceded by Yves-Alexandre de Marbeuf	Bishop of Autun; 1788–1791	Succeeded by Jean-Louis Gouttes
Political offices
Preceded by Jean-Xavier Bureau de Pusy	President of the National Assembly of France; 1790	Succeeded by François-Xavier-Marc-Antoine de Montesquiou-Fézensac
Preceded by Étienne Eustache Bruix	Ministers of Marine and the Colonies; 1799	Succeeded by Marc Antoine Bourdon de Vatry
Preceded by Charles-François Delacroix	Minister of Foreign Affairs; 1797–1799	Succeeded by Charles-Frédéric Reinhard
Preceded by Charles-Frédéric Reinhard	Minister of Foreign Affairs; 1799–1807	Succeeded by Jean-Baptiste de Nompère de Champagny
New office	Grand Chamberlain of France; 1804–1814	Position abolished
Preceded by Antoine René Charles Mathurin	Minister of Foreign Affairs; 1814–1815	Succeeded by Armand Augustin Louis de Caulaincourt
Preceded by Louis Pierre Edouard	Minister of Foreign Affairs; 1815	Succeeded by Armand-Emmanuel de Vignerot du Plessis
New office	Prime Minister of France; 1815	Succeeded by Armand-Emmanuel de Vignerot du Plessis
French nobility
New title	Duke of Talleyrand; 1815–1838	Succeeded by Edmond de Talleyrand-Périgord
Preceded by Robert Guiscard	Prince of Benevento; 1806–1815	Succeeded by Principality abolished
