= François-Auguste Fauveau de Frénilly =

French peer and memorialist

- Born: November 14, 1768; Paris, France
- Died: August 1, 1848 (aged 79); Graz, Austria
- Resting place: Montparnasse Cemetery, Paris
- Occupation: Peer of France
- Known for: Député de la Loire-Atlantique
- Notable work: Considérations sur une année de l'histoire de France

François-Auguste Fauveau de Frénilly (November 14, 1768 – August 1, 1848) was a French diplomat, writer, poet and civic leader. Appointed as Peer of France, King Louis XVIII nicknamed him "Frenzy".

== Biography ==
=== Early life ===
François-Auguste Fauveau de Frénilly was born in Paris, France, on November 14, 1768 to Frédéric-Auguste Fauveau de Frénilly and Charlotte-Pauline-Victoire Chastelain. His family was of old nobility and was on the same level with the upper magistrature of Paris. Frénilly was educated and trained to attain the highest levels of the French Aristocracy and as such held disdain for the French Revolution. Frénilly studied law under Bishop Lévesque de Pouilly in Reims, France successfully defending his thesis after three years of dedicated study. After completing his studies, in consultation with his mother and his uncle, Frénilly began preparation for a financial career in anticipation of receiving title to Receiver-General of the Domaines Poitou and Angoumois.

=== The First Revolution ===
In anticipation of being granted his titles, Frénilly moved to the provinces and setup office in Poitou in early 1788, learning dominial tasks. While the French Revolution began in the summer of 1789 Frénilly watched from afar. In the spring of 1790, Frénilly suddenly departed the provinces to return to Paris arriving on the eve of July 14, 1790, known as Fête de la Fédération. Frénilly settled in to his Mother's estate on Rue Vivienne. Opposite from their house was the estate of Mme. de Lessart, whose son, Claude Antoine de Valdec de Lessart would be massacred at Versailles years later. During this time in 1790, Catherine Noël Grand would spend an inordinate amount of time visiting Mme. de Lessart in the hopes of gaining the favor of her son. Sometime later before Catherine would marry Charles Maurice de Talleyrand-Périgord, and become Princesse de Bénévent, Frénilly would find himself at the center of her attentions and they would vacation together to his Lake Cottage. Ultimately, Frénilly would deem Catherine "stupid to the point of silliness" and avoided further interaction.

During this time of turmoil, Frénilly found "There were but two means of shining: one by attacking the throne, the other by defending it" and that he was not well versed in either. As Paris descended into turmoil in the summer of 1792, Frénilly joined the Filles-Saint-Thomas and established his estate as one of the rally points upon the sound of the general drum. On August 9, 1792 while enjoying dinner with family, The general drum call to arms was sounded. Frénilly rushed to dress himself and assembled with his whole battalion at Boulevard des Italiens. The Filles de Saint Thomas Battalion then noiselessly marched to Tuleries and entered the grand terrace by the Pavilion de Marsan Gate. There the Filles de Saint Thomas Battalion set up defensive positions having linked up with three other faithful battalions to include Petits-Pères.

At six o'clock in the morning, Louis XVI came to pass us in review. What a discouraging review it was for men who merely asked for a master and a guide. I can still see the unfortunate prince passing in front of us; silent and careworn as he slouched along. All seeming to say "All is lost!" His team of attendants that surrounded him cried "Gentlemen! Long live the King!" We had been ordered to observe silence when under arms and we obeyed when we ought to have disobeyed. As to the rebel battalions, the only cry they knew was that of "Long live the Nation!" Everyone of them was silent, the King and the army. Louis thought that he could see his condemnation in our silence, whilst we read his ruin in his.

Over the course of August 10, 1792, the Filles de Saint Thomas Battalion and Frénilly were re-positioned from Tuleries to two other courtyards, the public uproar increased and fighting broke out. Tumult ensued for most of the day until the order from the King came lay down arms. Frénilly and others disbanded mingling into the crowds with their blue coats, Swiss red coats were not so lucky. Frénilly then retired to the provinces during The Reign of Terror and returned to Paris after "le 9 Thermidor" (The Thermidorian Reaction), to collect what was left of his family's considerable fortune.
