= Pierre-Alexandre-Laurent Forfait =

French shipwright, hydrographer and politician (1752–1807)

Pierre-Alexandre Laurent Forfait
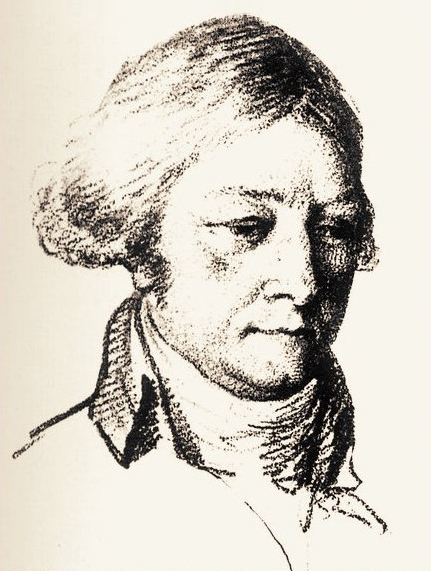
- Portrait by Mattheus van Bree, 1803–1807
- Born: 21 April 1752; Rouen, France
- Died: 8 November 1807 (aged 55); Rouen, France
- Occupations: Shipwright, hydrographer, politician
- Awards: Commandeur of the Legion of Honour

Pierre-Alexandre-Laurent Forfait (21 April 1752 – 8 November 1807) was a French shipwright, hydrographer and politician who served as Minister of the Navy and the Colonies from 1799 to 1801.

== Career ==
Born to a family of rich merchants, Forfait studied at a Jesuit college in Rouen, where he was awarded prizes in Mathematics and Hydrography upon graduation. In 1773, and in spite being a Commoner, he was admitted as an assistant member of Rouen Academy and assistant naval engineer, before serving at Brest harbour.

In 1777, Forfait rose to sub-engineer under Antoine Groignard. In 1781, he was made an adjunct member of the Naval Academy. In 1783, he embarked on the 110-gun Terrible, part of a Franco-Spanish fleet assembled before Cádiz under Admiral d'Estaing, but the end of the American War of Independence occurred before it saw action. Forfait nevertheless helped repair eleven of the ships of the fleet.

After the Treaty of Paris, he returned to work at the Naval Academy and notably authored a Traité de la mâture (Note: "Treaty of Rigging") upon request by Castries, then Secretary of State of the Navy. In recognition, he was admitted as a corresponding member in the Academy of Sciences. He simultaneously developed new techniques to improve the disposition of cargo in ships' holds.

In 1789, he was appointed director of the service of Le Havre harbour, where he improved the design of fluyts. He was then sent to England to study the British shipbuilding techniques, and authored Observations on the Navy of England upon his return.

After the outbreak of the French Revolution, Forfait was elected at the Legislative Assembly in 1791 as deputy for the Seine-Inférieure. His moderate positions earned him the mocking nickname of "Juste Milieu", (Note: "Right Middle") which he wore with pride. At the end of his mandate in September 1792, he returned to shipbuilding at Le Havre.

Around this time, Forfait designed the 38-gun frigate Seine, which included structural innovations and were designed to carry 24-pounder long guns — more powerful than the usual 18-pounder long guns usually born by ships of this size, although the Seine was eventually armed with 18-pounders. The Seine class, built on these plans, came to comprise 7 ships. Forfait furthered his efforts with the Romaine class in 1794, and was also involved in the design of the Etna-class corvettes.

During the Reign of Terror, he was accused at a political club of Le Havre. He was eventually freed by the Committee of Public Safety and made general inspector for forests. In 1794, he was tasked to design specialised ships to navigate the Seine river; he consequently design a lugger, the Saumon, and authored a Mémoire sur la navigation de la Seine.

In 1797, the Directory tasked him, along with Rosily-Mesros and David, to study the possibility of establishing a military harbour in Antwerp; these studies were followed by the construction of an arsenal. He was then sent to the recently captured Venice, where he oversaw the launch of ships under construction in her arsenal and appropriated by the French in the Campaign of Italy; in August 1797, these frigates were launched as Muiron and Carrère.

Tasked with the naval preparations of the French campaign in Egypt and Syria, Forfait prepared 15 ships of the line, 14 frigates, 72 lesser warships and 400 transports in Toulon, Genoa, Ajaccio and Civitavecchia. He then returned to Le Havre, where he designed 3 heavily armed gunboats to repel British bomb vessels.

After the Coup of 18 Brumaire, Forfait became Napoleon Bonaparte's first Minister of the Navy, an office which he held from November 1799 until his resignation on 1 October 1801, while simultaneously designing ships of the Navy and plans for Boulogne harbour. At the collapse of the Peace of Amiens and the outbreak of the War of the Third Coalition in May 1803, Forfait was tasked with improving the Flottille de Boulogne.

In 1805, Forfait was sent to Genoa as Maritime Prefect, tasked to establish a naval presence there. He managed to successfully launch the 74-gun Génois, whose originally intended launch had been botched by her constructors, leaving the ship damaged and stuck on her railing. He nevertheless fell in disfavour after the affair.

Forfait retired in Rouen, where he died on 8 November 1807.

== Honours ==
- Commandeur of the Legion of Honour
- The French Navy screw corvette Forfait was named in his honour.
- A large portrait of Forfait is exposed at the Mairie of Rouen.

== Works ==
- Traité élémentaire de la mâture des vaisseaux à l’usage des élèves de la marine, Paris, Clousier, 1788
- Observations sur l’établissement des milices bourgeoises et de la milice nationale de l’année, 1789
- Opinion de Pierre Forfait sur l’affaire du Ministre de la marine, Paris, Imprimerie nationale, 1792
- Expériences faites, par ordre du gouvernement sur la navigation de la Seine, Paris, Imprimerie nationale, 1792
- Rapport sur la proposition d’armer trente vaisseaux fait au nom des Comités Diplomatique et de Marine, Paris, Imprimerie nationale, 1792
- Opinion sur le projet d'organisation de l'artillerie de la marine, Paris, Impr. nationale, 1792
- Lettres d'un observateur sur la marine, sur son organisation actuelle et sur la guerre continentale et maritime en général, Paris, Clousier, 1802
- Marine et colonies. Exercice de l’an VIII. Compte que rend aux consuls de la République le Cen P.-A.-L. Forfait des dépenses ordonnancées pour le service de son département pendant l’an VIII, Paris, Impr. de la République, an IX
- Solutio problematis ab Regia scientiarum et literarum academia Mantuana propositi ad annum MDCCLXXVI : Eum modum determinare, quo, minimo labore, & minima impensa, navigabiles alvei expediantur ex arenae, & terrae acervis, qui horum fundum altius evehunt, Mantuae, Typis H.A. Pazzoni, 1777

== Sources and references ==
=== Bibliography ===
- Levot, Prosper (1866). Les gloires maritimes de la France: notices biographiques sur les plus célèbres marins (in French). Bertrand. p. 190.
- Roche, Jean-Michel (2005). "Génois (1805)". Dictionnaire des bâtiments de la flotte de guerre française de Colbert à nos jours. Vol. 1. Group Retozel-Maury Millau. p. 223. ISBN 978-2-9525917-0-6. OCLC 165892922.
- Lebreton, Théodore-Éloi (1865). Biographie rouennaise (in French). Le Brument.

Preceded by Marc Antoine Bourdon de Vatry	Ministers of Marine and the Colonies; November 1799 - 1801	Succeeded by Denis Decrès
