= French frigate Muiron =

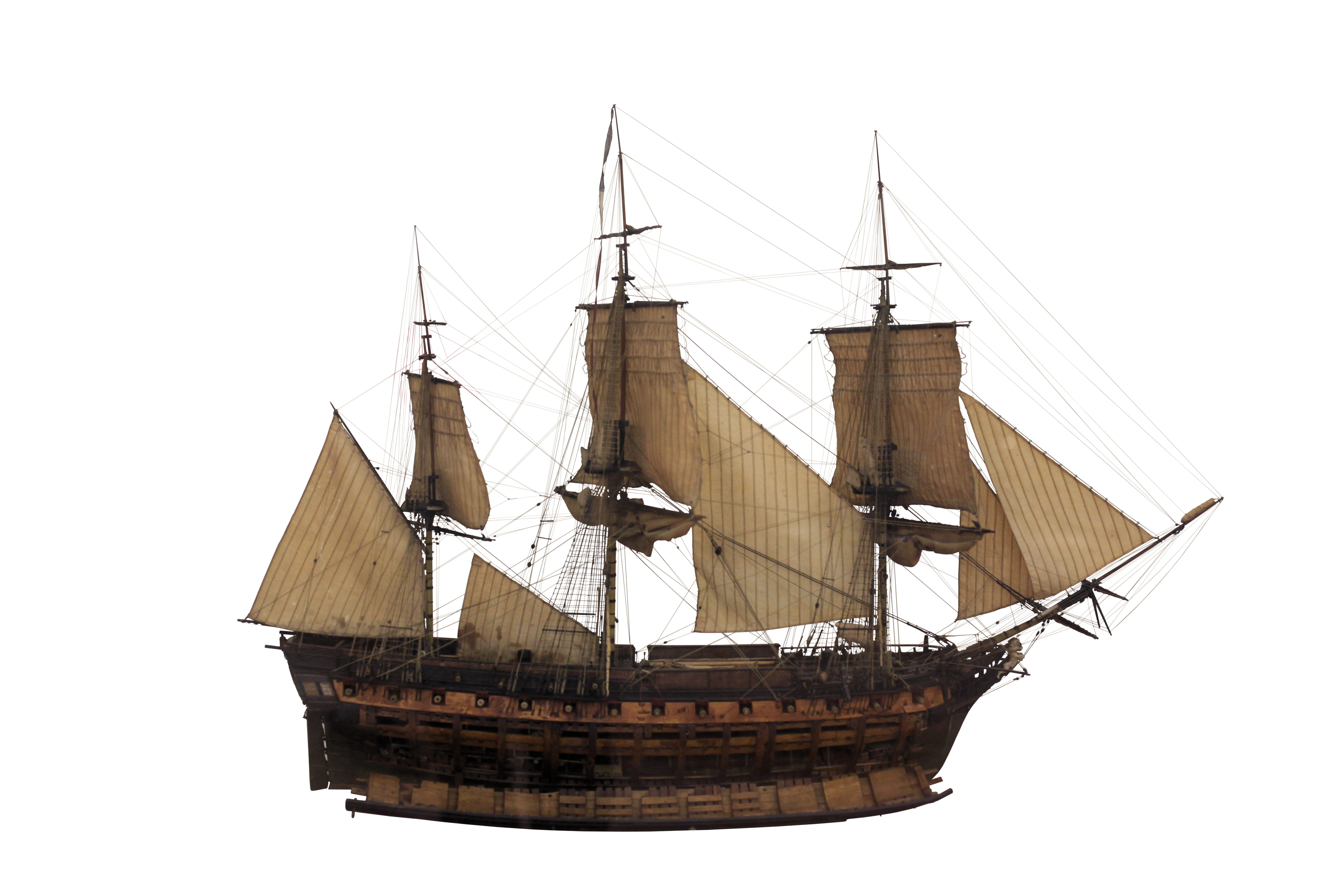
- 1/72 Scale model of the Muiron, on display at the Musée national de la Marine

History

France
- Name: Muiron
- Namesake: Jean-Baptiste Muiron
- Builder: Arsenal of Venice
- Laid down: 1789
- Launched: 22 August 1797
- Completed: November 1797
- Home port: Toulon
- Captured: On stock by the French, in May 1797
- Fate: Hulked 1807; destroyed in 1850

General characteristics
- Class & type: 44-gun frigate
- Tons burthen: 1,029.3 tonnes
- Length: 46 m (150 ft 11 in)
- Beam: 12 m (39 ft 4 in)
- Propulsion: Sail
- Complement: 340
- Armament: 28 × 18-pounder; 12 × 6-pounder
- Armour: Timber

Muiron was a frigate of the French Navy, famous for ferrying Bonaparte on the 22 August 1799 under the flagship of Admiral Ganteaume from Egypt to France after the Battle of Abukir.

The Muiron was one of two 18-pounder armed frigates that were building on the stocks in the Arsenal of Venice in November 1796, when Bonaparte took Venice during the Campaign of Italy. The two frigates were launched in August 1797 under the names Carrère and Muiron, and completed during November by the orders of Pierre-Alexandre Forfait. Muiron was named to honour Colonel Jean-Baptiste Muiron, an aide-de-camp of Bonaparte who had covered Bonaparte with his body during the Battle of the Bridge of Arcole.

The Muiron was armed with 28 × 18-pounder guns on the upper deck, and 12 × 6-pounder guns on the quarterdeck and forecastle, and manned with a complement of 340. She was incorporated in the fleet that invaded Egypt, and after the Battle of the Nile, Bonaparte departed for France aboard. She later took part in the Battle of Algeciras Bay. In 1807, Napoleon ordered that the Muiron be preserved as a monument; to this effect, he wrote a letter to the Ministry of the Navy, stating "I wish that the Muiron on which I came back from Egypt be kept as a monument and placed in such a way that it be preserved, if possibly, several hundreds years". She was repaired and docked in Toulon, which a golden inscription on her hull stating "The Muiron, taken in 1797 in Venice arsenal by the conqueror of Italy. She brought back the saviour of France from Egypt in 1799". Napoléon also had a finely crafted scale model made for his study in Malmaison in 1803. This model is now on display at the Musée national de la Marine in Paris.

At the Bourbon Restoration, Muiron was decommissioned, and she was eventually destroyed in 1850, in circumstances that remain unclear. Conflicting theories have it that she was either sold for material and broken up, or destroyed by fire after being struck by lightning.

The British captured her sister ship in August 1801 and added her to the British Navy as HMS Carrere.

Representations of Muiron
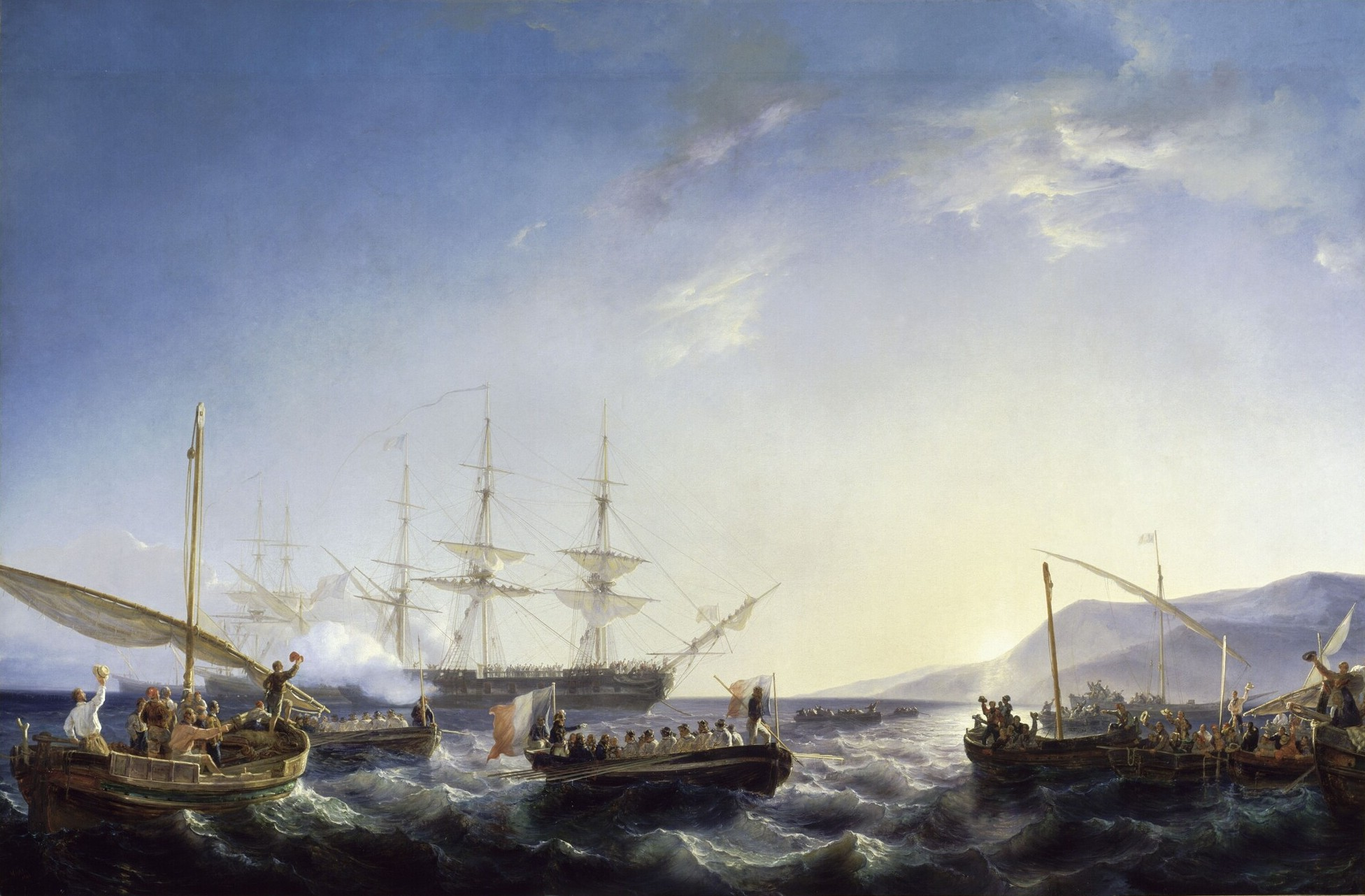
Arrival in France of Bonaparte on the return from Egypt on 9 October 1799, by Louis Meijer.

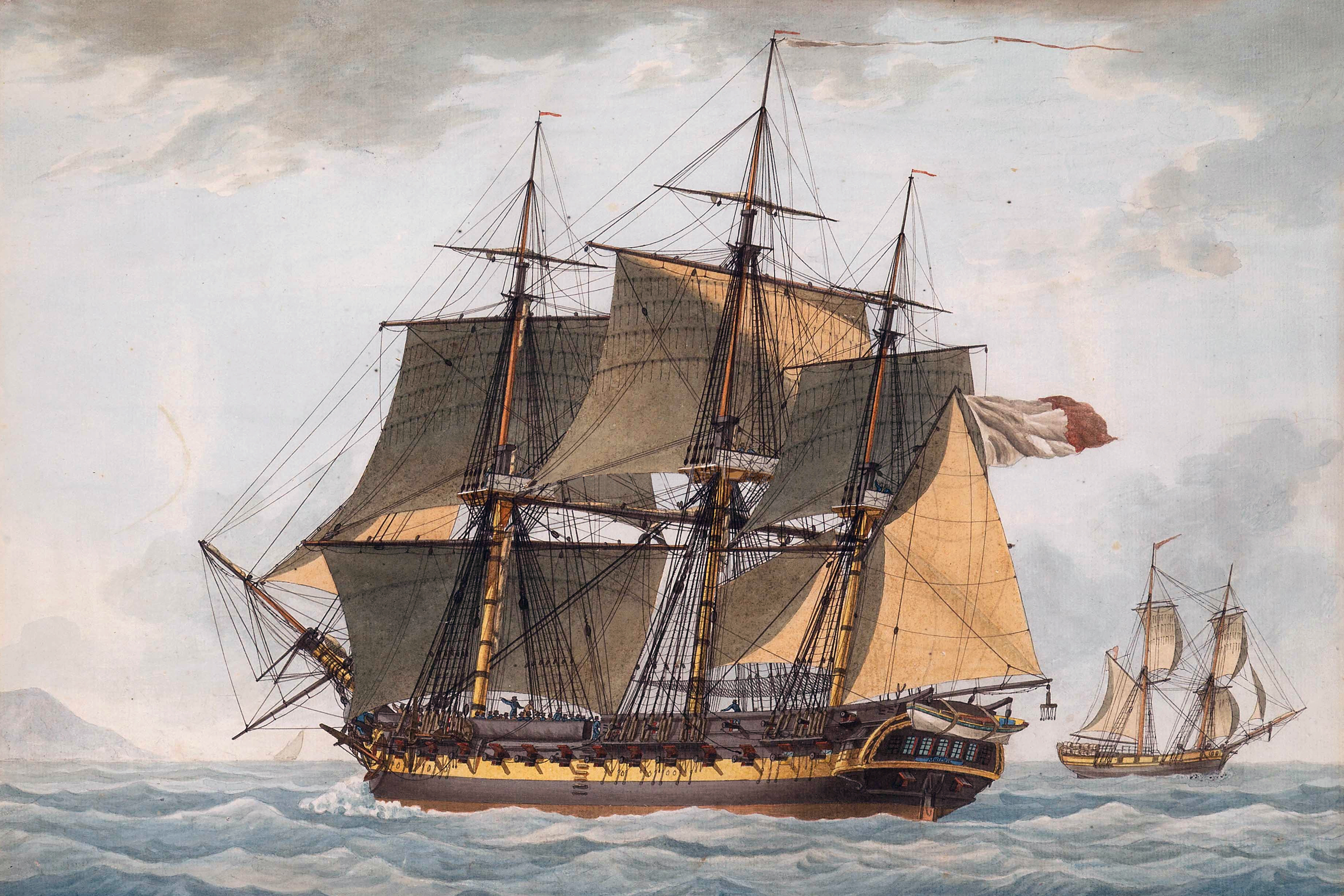
Portrait of Muiron by Antoine Roux
