= François-Xavier-Marc-Antoine de Montesquiou-Fézensac =

French clergyman and politician

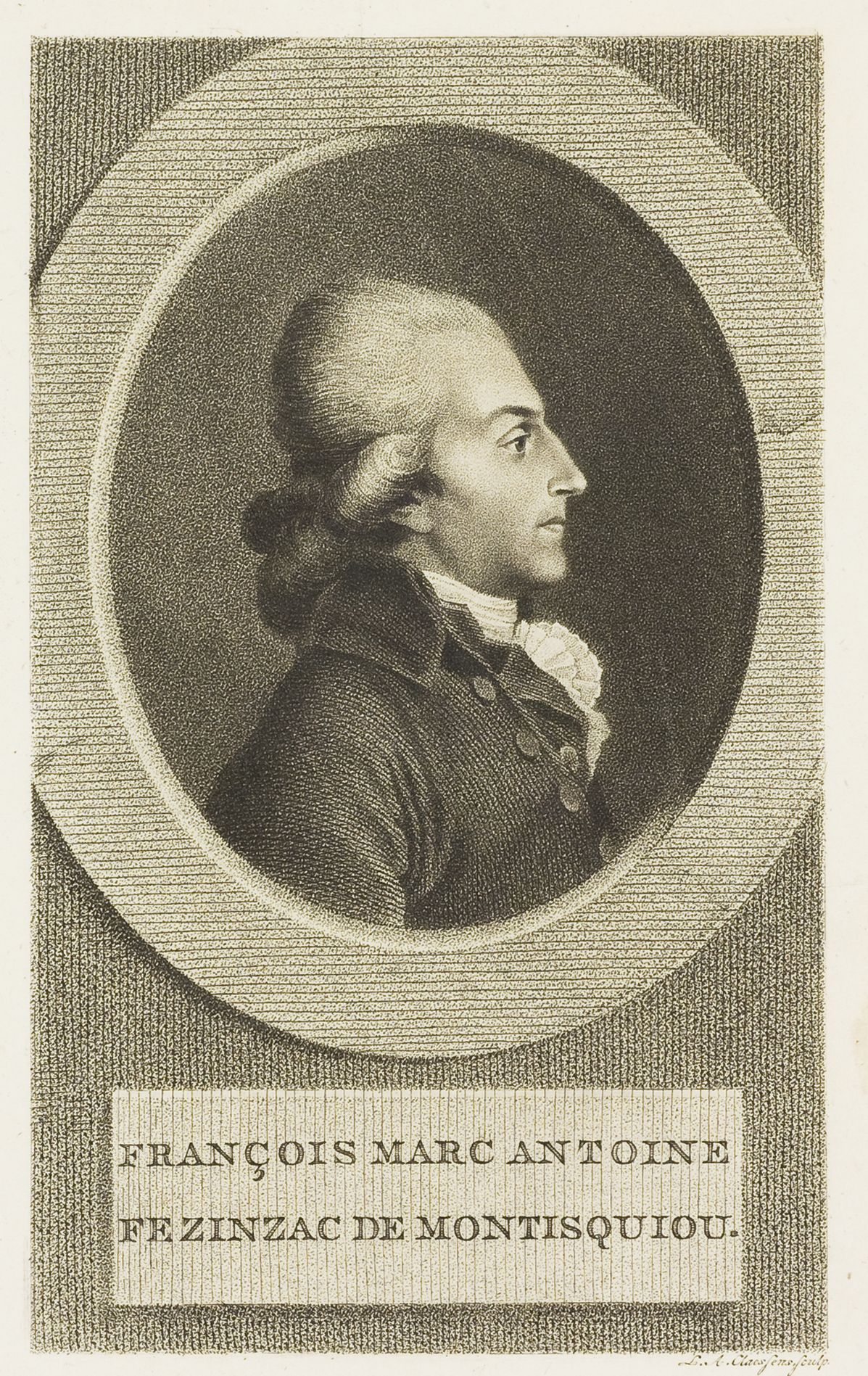
François-Xavier-Marc-Antoine de Montesquiou-Fézensac

Abbé François-Xavier-Marc-Antoine de Montesquiou-Fézensac (château de Marsan, Gers, 3 August 1757 – Chateau de Cirey, Haute-Marne, 4 February 1832) was a French clergyman and politician.

== Biography ==
He was a member of a very old French nobility family from Gascony. His kinsman Anne-Pierre, marquis de Montesquiou-Fézensac would serve alongside him in the National Assembly.

Montesquiou-Fézensac was named (1782) Abbé of Beaulieu, near Langres. The Abbé de Montesquieu attended the Assembly of the French clergy (1785) as Agent-General.

== French Revolution ==
The Abbé was elected by the First Estate of Paris to the Estates General of 1789. He would stand out alongside the Abbé Maury by his oratory, and was elected president of the National Assembly three times. He presided over the Assembly an impressive three terms (4–18 January 1790; 28 February - 15 March 1790; 14–30 March 1791).

He opposed strongly the Civil Constitution of the Clergy and supported the monarchy. He was forced to flee to England after the Storming of the Tuileries (10 August 1792). He lived in the United States 1792-1795 during the Reign of Terror.

== Restoration ==
He returned to France after 9 Thermidor (27 July 1794) and immediately took up the royalist cause as one of the agents of Louis XVIII. He became a member of the Royalist Committee in Paris, and for his activism he was once exiled to Menton.

Under the First Restoration he was appointed Minister of the Interior ( 13 May 1814 - 19 March 1815 ). In his brief term he appointed Pierre-Paul Royer-Collard and director of the library François Guizot secretary general.

The Second Restoration, he had the title of Minister of State. Elected deputy by the department of Gers, he opted for the Chamber of Peers with the title of Count (as of 31 August 1817) and Duke (as of 30 April 1821). He resigned his peerage 9 January 1832, shortly before his death.

He was appointed member of the Académie française by royal decree of 21 March 1816 . He was also elected member of the Academy of Inscriptions and Belles-Lettres on 12 August 1816.

He left manuscripts on the history of Louis XV and Louis XVI and a travel journal for the U.S. and Canada but did nothing to have them published.

Government offices
| Preceded by Jacques Claude Beugnot | Interior Minister; 1814–1815 | Succeeded by Lazare Nicolas Marguerite Carnot |
