= HMS Carrere =

Frigate of the Royal Navy

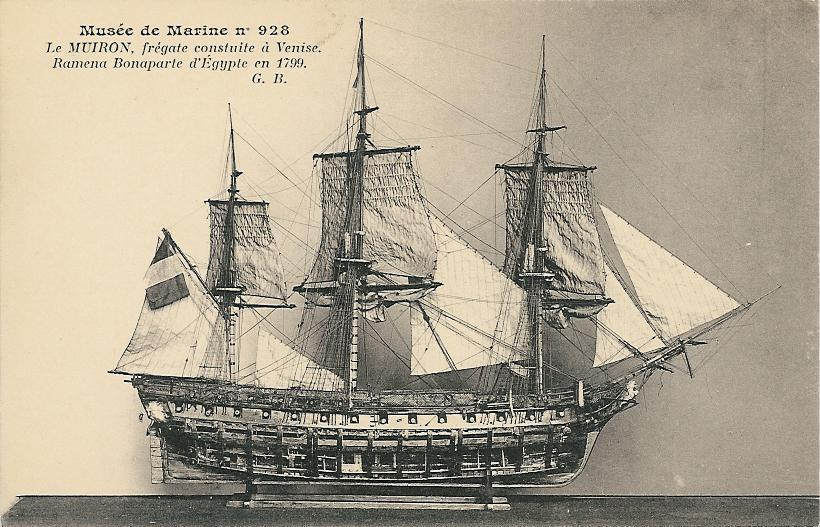
- 1/72 scale model of the Carrère's sister ship, the Muiron, on display at the Musée national de la Marine

History

France
- Name: Carrère
- Namesake: Colonel Carrère
- Builder: Venice
- Laid down: 1789
- Launched: 20 August 1797
- Completed: November 1797
- Captured: By the British on 3 August 1801

United Kingdom
- Name: HMS Carrere
- Acquired: 3 August 1801
- Fate: Sold on 1 September 1814

General characteristics
- Class & type: 36-gun frigate
- Tons burthen: 1013 (bm)
- Length: 151 ft (46 m)
- Beam: 39 ft 6 in (12.04 m)
- Sail plan: Full-rigged ship
- Complement: French service: 356; British service: 340 (352)
- Armament: French service: 28 × 18-pounder guns + 12 brass 8-pounder guns; FC: 2 × 36-pounder obusiers; QD: 2 × 36-pounder obusiers; British service: 12 × 32-pounder carronades + 22 × 18-pounder guns 4 × 9-pounder guns
- Armour: Timber

Carrère was a French frigate that served briefly in the French navy before the British captured her in 1801, naming her HMS Carrere. She seems never to have seen any meaningful active duty after her capture as she was laid up in 1802 and finally sold in 1814.

== French service ==
Carrère was one of two 38-gun frigates that were being built on the Venetian Arsenal's stocks for the Venetian navy in May 1797, when French forces under Napoleon occupied the city during the Italian campaigns of the French Revolutionary Wars. Pierre-Alexandre Forfait ordered the two frigates completed, which they were in August 1797 under the names Carrère and Muiron. The French named Carrère after an artillery colonel who had fallen at Unzmarkt fighting the Austrians.

Carrère and Muiron both served in the French invasion of Egypt in 1798. They accompanied Napoleon on his return to France in 1799. The captain of the Carrère was Commodore Pierre Dumanoir le Pelley, and with him travelled generals Jean Lannes, Joachim Murat, and Auguste de Marmont.

== Capture ==
The British 48-gun frigate Pomone, in company with Phoenix and Pearl, captured Carrère near Elba on 3 August 1801 after a short fight. She was escorting a small convoy from Porto Ercole to Porto Longone during the Siege of Porto Ferrajo. Pomone lost two men killed and four wounded, of whom two died later. The French casualty list was not initially available.

The Royal Navy took her in as HMS Carrere, but rated at 36 guns. Frederick Lewis Maitland was her first captain. He sailed her to Portsmouth, where she arrived on 24 September 1802.

== Fate ==
Carrère's active duty career in the Royal Navy was short. She was paid off on 4 October 1802 and then laid up in ordinary. She was sold on 1 September 1814. The purchasers had to post a bond of £3000 that they would not sell or otherwise dispose of her but would break her up within 12 months from the day of sale.
