= Minister of Police (France) =

- Ministre de la Police
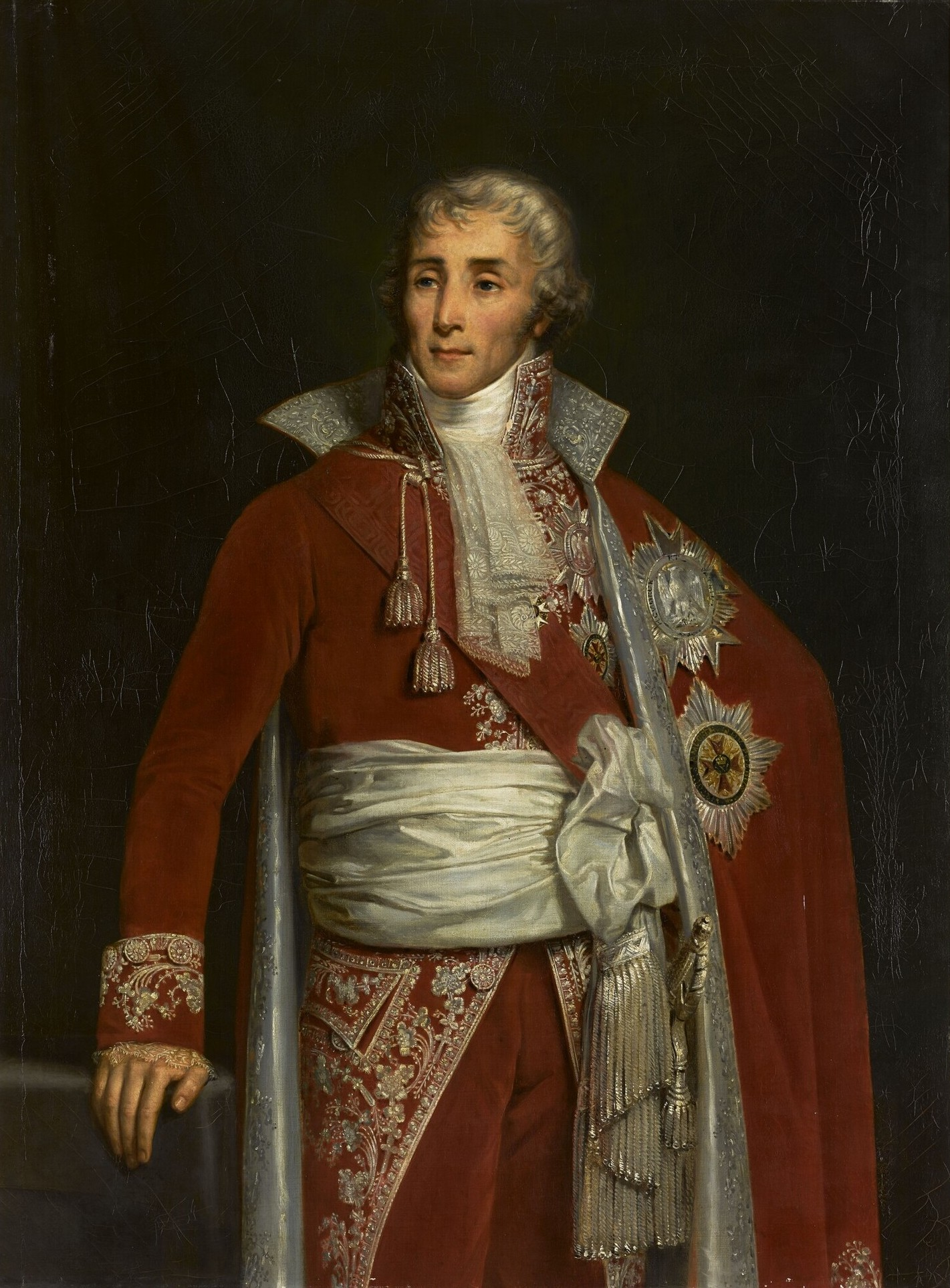
- Longest serving Joseph Fouché
- Ministry of Police
- Status: Abolished
- Member of: Government: Council of Ministers
- Term length: No fixed term
- Formation: 2 January 1796
- First holder: Philippe Antoine Merlin de Douai
- Final holder: Charlemagne de Maupas
- Abolished: 21 June 1853
- Succession: Minister of Interior

The Minister of Police (French: Ministre de la Police) was the leader and most senior official of the French Ministry of Police. It was a position in the Government of France from 1796 to 1818 and briefly from 1852 to 1853.

== History ==
The office was created on 2 January 1796 by taking police powers away from the Minister of Interior and giving them to the new Minister of Police. The move was motivated by an apparent overload of the Interior department. The first minister, Philippe-Antoine Merlin, was appointed two days later, as Armand-Gaston Camus refused the office. The most famous minister was Joseph Fouché, whose service spanned over a decade.

It was a major French ministerial position under the Directory, Consulate, First Empire, and Restored Bourbon Dynasty. The position was merged into the Ministry of Interior in 1818, although it was briefly restored by Napoleon III in 1852.

== Officeholders ==
=== First Republic ===
No.	Portrait	Name	Term (Note: Dates in italic correspond to the French Republican calendar, used between 1793 (and retroactively 1792) and 1805.)			Government	Head of State	Ref.
No.	Portrait	Name	Took office	Left office	Time in office	Government	Head of State	Ref.
Ministry established
(Note: Appointed, but refused.)		Armand-Gaston Camus	2 January 1796; 12 Nivôse Year IV	4 January 1796; 14 Nivôse Year IV	2 days	Directory	Directory	
1		Philippe-Antoine Merlin	4 January 1796; 14 Nivôse Year IV	3 April 1796; 14 Germinal Year IV	90 days	Directory	Directory	
2		Charles Cochon de Lapparent	3 April 1796; 14 Germinal Year IV	16 July 1797; 28 Messidor Year V	1 year, 104 days	Directory	Directory	
3		Jean-Jacques Lenoir-Laroche	16 July 1797; 28 Messidor Year V	26 July 1797; 8 Thermidor Year V	10 days	Directory	Directory	
4		Pierre Jean-Marie Sotin de La Coindière	26 July 1797; 8 Thermidor Year V	13 February 1798; 25 Pluviôse Year VI	202 days	Directory	Directory	
5		Nicolas Dondeau	13 February 1798; 25 Pluviôse Year VI	16 May 1798; 27 Floréal Year VI	92 days	Directory	Directory	
6		Marie Jean François Philibert Lecarlier	16 May 1798; 27 Floréal Year VI	29 October 1798; 8 Brumaire Year VII	166 days	Directory	Directory	
7		Jean-Pierre Duval	29 October 1798; 8 Brumaire Year VII	23 June 1799; 5 Messidor Year VII	237 days	Directory	Directory	
8		Claude Sébastien Bourguignon	23 June 1799; 5 Messidor Year VII	20 July 1799; 2 Thermidor Year VII	27 days	Directory	Directory	
9		Joseph Fouché	20 July 1799; 2 Thermidor Year VII	18 May 1804; 28 Floréal Year XII	4 years, 303 days	Directory	Directory	
9		Joseph Fouché	20 July 1799; 2 Thermidor Year VII	18 May 1804; 28 Floréal Year XII	4 years, 303 days	Consulate	Napoléon Bonaparte	

=== First Empire ===
No.	Portrait	Name	Term			Government	Emperor	Ref.
No.	Portrait	Name	Took office	Left office	Time in office	Government	Emperor	Ref.
(9)		Joseph Fouché; Duc d'Otrante	18 May 1804	3 June 1810	6 years, 16 days	Napoléon	Napoléon I	(Note: Remained in office at the proclamation of the Empire.)
10		Anne Jean Marie René Savary; Duc de Rovigo	3 June 1810	3 April 1814	3 years, 304 days	Napoléon	Napoléon I	

=== Restoration ===
No.	Portrait	Name	Term			Government	King	Ref.
No.	Portrait	Name	Took office	Left office	Time in office	Government	King	Ref.
11		Jules Anglès	3 April 1814	13 May 1814	40 days	Provisional Government	Louis XVIII	
12		Jacques Claude (Note: As Director General of Police.); Comte Beugnot	13 May 1814	3 December 1814	244 days	Restoration	Louis XVIII	

=== Hundred Days ===
No.	Portrait	Name	Term			Government	Emperor	Ref.
No.	Portrait	Name	Took office	Left office	Time in office	Government	Emperor	Ref.
13		Joseph Fouché; Duc d'Otrante	20 March 1815	23 June 1815	95 days	Hundred Days	Napoléon I	
14		Jean Pelet; Comte de la Lozère	23 June 1815	7 July 1815	14 days	Hundred Days	Napoléon I	

=== Kingdom of France ===
No.	Portrait	Name	Term			Government	King	Ref.
No.	Portrait	Name	Took office	Left office	Time in office	Government	King	Ref.
15		Joseph Fouché; Duc d'Otrante	9 July 1815	26 September 1815	79 days	Talleyrand-Périgord	Louis XVIII	
16		Élie Louis; Duc Decazes	26 September 1815	29 December 1818	3 years, 94 days	Richelieu	Louis XVIII	

=== Second Republic ===
No.	Portrait	Name	Term			Government	President	Ref.
No.	Portrait	Name	Took office	Left office	Time in office	Government	President	Ref.
17		Charlemagne de Maupas	22 January 1852	21 June 1853	1 year, 150 days	Napoléon II – III	Louis-Napoléon Bonaparte	
Ministry disestablished
