= Nicolas Dondeau =

French lawyer and politician

- Born: 25 March 1752; Fontaine-Denis-Nuisy, Marne, France
- Died: 21 October 1834 (aged 82); Provins, Seine-et-Marne, France
- Occupations: Lawyer, politician
- Known for: Minister of Police

Nicolas Dondeau (25 March 1752 – 21 October 1834) was a French lawyer and politician who was Minister of Police during the French Revolution.

== Early years ==
Nicolas Dondeau was born at Fontaine-Denis, Marne, on 25 March 1752. His parents were sieur Claude Dondeau and Catherine Bregeon. He was made principal of Anchin College in Douai in 1772. He became an advocate at the parliament of Douai in 1785, where he exercised various administration and judicial functions. On 23 April 1786 he married Marguerite-Françoise Davesnes, daughter of an advocate at the parliament of Flanders. In May 1791 he was a municipal commissioner of Douai, and in the absence of Louis-Joseph Art was acting as procureur of the commune. Dondeau entered the administration and became a head of division in the Ministry of the General Police under Philippe-Antoine Merlin de Douai.

== Minister ==
Dondeau was named Minister of the General Police on 25 Pluvôise VI (13 February 1798). He replaced Pierre Jean-Marie Sotin de La Coindière. His conduct as a minister was sensible and moderate. On 22 Ventôse VI (12 March 1798) he addressed a letter to justices of the peace and officers of the police recommending that they repress libertinism. On 12 Germinal VI (1 April 1798) he sent another letter about the troubles stirred up by agitators during public performances, who stubbornly demanded symphonies, airs or dances that had not been announced on the posters. On 24 Floréal VI (13 May 1798) he wrote to the director of the theater of Montansier saying he had heard that actors were appearing on stage with their hair in rolls, which he described as an insolent scandal.

== Later career ==
On 27 Floréal VI (16 May 1798) Dondeau resigned as minister and was replaced by Marie Jean François Philibert Lecarlier. The same day he was named administrator of the lotteries in place of Thabaud de Surins, who had been elected deputy. In 1800 he was named judge of the criminal court of the department of Seine-et-Marne. He became a counselor of the court, and retired on 17 January 1816. He died at Provins, Seine-et-Marne, on 21 October 1834.

== Sources ==
- Dechristé, Louis Ferdinand (1880). Douai pendant la révolution (1789-1802). La Société bibliographique.
- Deregnaucourt (1828). Ephémérides historiques de la ville de Douai. Impr. Deregnaucourt.
- Duthilloeul, Hippolyte Romain Joseph (1844). "Dondeau". Galerie Douaisienne: ou, Biographie des hommes remarquables de la ville de Douai. A. d'Aubers, Impr.
- "Liste chronologique des ministres de la police". Société française d'histoire de la police.
- Robert, Adolphe; Cougny, Gaston (1891). "Dondeau (Nicolas)". Dictionnaire des parlementaires français de 1789 à 1889 (PDF). Vol. 2.
- Robinet, Jean François Eugène (1899). Dictionnaire historique et biographique de la révolution et de l'empire, 1789-1815. Vol. 1. Librairie historique de la révolution et de l'empire.
