= Claude Sébastien Bourguignon =

French Politician

Claude Sébastien Bourguignon-Dumolard (born March 18, 1760 in Vif, died April 23, 1829 in Paris) was a French jurist and politician.

== Childhood and youth ==
He was born in the fortified house of Molard, in the hamlet of Champrond, near Vif, and spent his childhood in the valley of the Gresse. He then went to Grenoble to study law. There he met his future wife, Dorothée Grand-Thorane, whom he married on 6 June 1780. The couple lived in Grenoble and had a son, Henri-Frédéric, in 1785.

== French Revolution ==
At the beginning of the French Revolution, he was a municipal officer, fulfilling administrative and judicial functions. Arrested on May 31, 1793 as an influential federalist, he was imprisoned in the Sainte-Marie d'en-Haut monastery in Grenoble. He was released after a few days for health reasons and confined to his home instead. Eventually released, he left Grenoble in 1794 and took refuge in Paris to escape the Law of Suspects.

There he dropped the name Dumolard, by which he was best known, retaining only his family name. Linked by interests and affection to the party that overthrew Robespierre, he was appointed, on 9 Thermidor Year II, Secretary General of the Committee of General Security, where he carried out the perilous mission of affixing seals to the warrants against the Robespierre brothers. He also ordered the release of a large number of prisoners.

He then joined the Ministry of the Interior as head of division, then as secretary general of the Ministry of Justice, and he became a commissioner of the Directory at the Civil Court of Paris and then at the Court of Cassation.

== Later life ==
When Louis-Jérôme Gohier joined the Directory, he had Bourguignon appointed, on 4 Messidor Year VII , Minister of Police, replacing Jean-Pierre Duval. He remained in office for only 27 days, yielding his place to Joseph Fouché and accepting instead the position of Registrar of Registration and Estates, but after Coup of 18 Brumaire, Napoleon withdrew this function from him.

The consular government appointed him judge at the criminal court of Paris and member of the board of directors of the fr: Régie de l'Enregistrement. Napoleon later elevated him to the position of deputy imperial attorney general of the High Court and then advisor to the imperial court of Paris.

In the trial of General Moreau he voted, with the majority, for a prison sentence (two years of detention), although he was convinced that he had been conspiring with Jean-Charles Pichegru and Georges Cadoudal.

He was made a knight of the Order of the Reunion on June 19, 1813.

He retired under the Second Restoration with the title of honorary advisor and opened a large law firm in Paris.

He died in Paris on April 22, 1829.

== Publications ==
Bourguignon-Dumolard published numerous works on the law, including:

- Manuel d'instruction criminelle (Manual of criminal procedure) (1810)
- Dictionnaire raisonné des lois pénales de France (Annotated Dictionary of the French Penal Code) (1811)
- Conférence des cinq Codes entre eux (Concordance of the Five Codes) (1818)
- Les Huit Codes annotés (The Eight Codes Annotated) (avec A. Dalloz, 1829)
- Mémoire sur l'institution du jury, couronné par la séance publique de l'Institut National du mois de Germinal an X (Memorandum on the Institution of the Jury, winning entry at the public session of the National Institute of the month of Germinal year X)
- Deuxième mémoire sur l’institution du jury (Second Memorandum on the Institution of the Jury)
- Troisième mémoire sur l’institution du jury. (Third Memorandum on the Institution of the Jury
