= French Government of the Hundred Days =

- Cabinet of the First French Empire
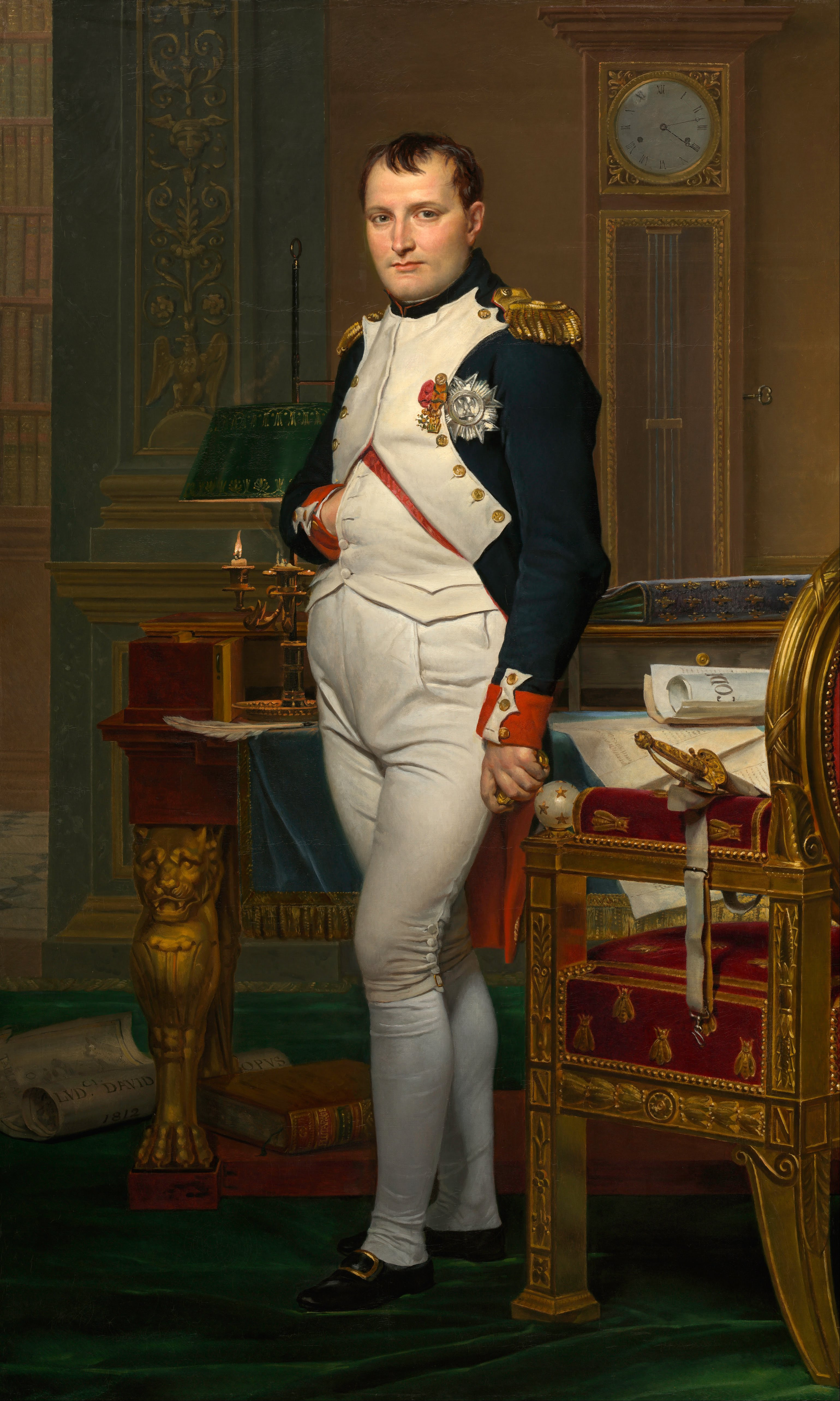
- Napoleon I
- Date formed: 20 March 1815
- Date dissolved: 22 June 1815

People and organisations
- Head of state: Napoleon
- Head of government: Napoleon

History
- Predecessor: Government of the first Bourbon restoration
- Successor: French Executive Commission of 1815

The French Government of the Hundred Days was formed by Napoleon I upon his resumption of the Imperial throne on 20 March 1815, replacing the government of the first Bourbon restoration which had been formed by King Louis XVIII the previous year. Following the defeat of Napoleon at the Battle of Waterloo and his second abdication on 22 June 1815 the Executive Commission of 1815 was formed as a new government, declaring the Empire abolished for a second time on 26 June.

== Formation ==
Almost a year after his first abdication, Napoleon left from exile on Elba and landed on the mainland near Cannes on 1 March 1815. He traveled north, with supporters flocking to his cause. On 16 March 1815, Louis XVIII addressed a meeting of both chambers, appealing to them to defend the constitutional charter. On the night of 19–20 March, the king left his palace for Ghent in Belgium. Napoleon entered Paris on 20 March. He announced his ministers that evening, after retaking possession of the Tuileries Palace.

== Ministers ==
The ministers were:

- Foreign Affairs: Armand Augustin Louis de Caulaincourt
- Finance: Martin-Michel-Charles Gaudin
- Treasury: Nicolas François, Count Mollien
- Interior: Lazare Carnot
- Police: Joseph Fouché
- Justice: Jean Jacques Régis de Cambacérès
- Navy and Colonies: Denis Decrès
- War: Louis-Nicolas Davout
- Secretary of State: Hugues-Bernard Maret, duc de Bassano

== Events ==
On 22 April 1815 the emperor announced changes to the constitution that defined the roles of the two chambers and of the ministers. On 1 June 1815 a major ceremony was held on the Champ de Mars in which the Emperor's authority was formally recognized. On 12 June 1815 Napoleon left Paris for the north, where the allied forces of Britain and Prussia were assembling. He was defeated at the Battle of Waterloo on 18 June 1815. Napoleon abdicated for the second time on 22 June 1815. That day the two chambers nominated the members of the French Provisional Government of 1815, which would serve as government until the second Bourbon Restoration.

== Sources ==
- Muel, Léon (1891). Gouvernements, ministères et constitutions de la France depuis cent ans: Précis historique des révolutions, des crises ministérielles et gouvernementales, et des changements de constitutions de la France depuis 1789 jusqu'en 1890 ... Marchal et Billard.
