= French Provisional Government =

The French Provisional Government may refer to:

- French Provisional Government of 1814, after the Napoleonic Wars
- French Provisional Government of 1815, after Napoleon's "Hundred Days" restoration
- French Provisional Government of 1848, after the July Monarchy
- Provisional Government of the French Republic, 1944–1946, after World War II
