= Marie Jean François Philibert Lecarlier d'Ardon =

French landowner and politician

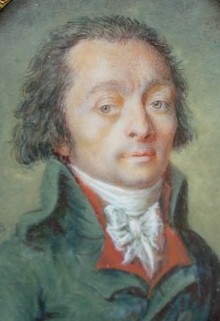
- Le Carlier d'Ardon circa 1792 by Jean-François Gérard dit Fontallard (1772–1857)
- Born: 20 November 1752; Laon, Aisne, France
- Died: 22 August 1799 (aged 46); Paris, France
- Occupations: Landowner, politician
- Known for: Minister of Police

Marie Jean François Philibert Lecarlier d'Ardon (20 November 1752 – 22 August 1799) was a wealthy French landowner who entered politics during the French Revolution and was Minister of Police for a few months.

== Early years ==
Marie Jean François Philibert Lecarlier d'Ardon was born in Laon (Aisne) on 20 November 1752. He was one of the wealthiest landowners in the province, and was appointed the king's secretary and mayor of Laon. On 22 March 1789, he was elected deputy of the third estate for Vermandois in the Estates General. He sat with the reformers, and spoke against export of grain. In June 1791, he was secretary of the Assembly. He was president of the district of Chauny after the session.

== Convention ==
Lecarlier was elected a member of the National Convention for the department of Aisne on 6 September 1792. At the trial of King Louis XVI, he voted for the appeal to the people and against the suspension. His vote on the death sentence was not recorded, but he is believed to have voted in favor. At the end of the Convention's session of 1795, he refused nomination to either of the two councils, but was elected anyway to the Council of Five Hundred on 4 Brumaire IV. He resigned six days later.

== Later career ==
After the coup of 18 Fructidor V (4 September 1797), Lecarlier was placed on the list of candidates for the French Directory to replace Lazare Carnot and François-Marie Barthelemy, who had been sentenced to deportation. He was not chosen. On 23 Germinal VI (12 April 1798), he was reelected to the Council of Ancients by the department of Aisne. He was appointed Commissioner Plenipotentiary of the French army in Switzerland, and was responsible for the organization of the Helvetic Republic. In this position, he addressed a proclamation to the Mountain and helped in defining the treaty of cooperation between the French and Swiss republics.

Lecarlier was appointed Minister of Police on 27 Floréal VI (16 May 1798). He replaced Nicolas Dondeau. He left office on 8 Brumaire VII (29 October 1798) and was replaced by Jean-Pierre Duval, Lecarlier was appointed Commissioner General in Belgium. He was re-elected by his department to the Council of Elders on 23 Germinal VII (12 April 1799). He died in Paris on 22 August 1799.
