= Jean-Jacques Lenoir-Laroche =

French lawyer (1749-1825)

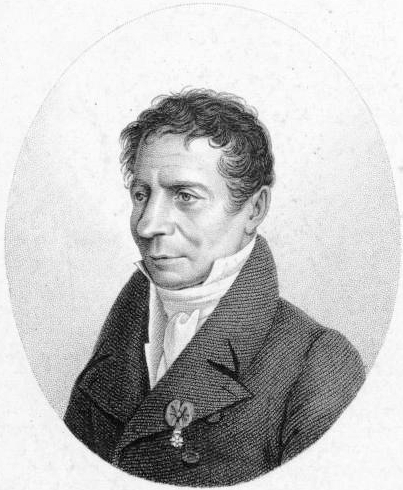
Jean-Jacques Lenoir-Laroche

Jean-Jacques Lenoir-Laroche, (Grenoble, April 29, 1749 - Paris, February 17, 1825) was a French lawyer, politician and journalist.

== Biography ==
Lenoir-Laroche enjoyed a good reputation in Grenoble. His memorandum Considerations on the constitution of the states of Dauphiné applicable to the States General allowed him to extend his fame as far as Paris. In 1789, he was appointed deputy to the Estates General.

Established in Paris, he worked for the newspaper Berlot, but was ousted for having defended Louis XVI in an article. From 1795 to 1798, he served as editor of Le Moniteur Universel. He also taught legislation at the École Centrale at the Panthéon. He did not hesitate to express his enthusiasm for the Constitution of the Year III in the newspaper he edited, and this position earned him the appointment of Minister of Police under the Directory. But this position did not seem suitable for him, and he only retained it for only a few days. He then entered the Council of Ancients. Having supported the coup of 18 Brumaire, he entered the Sénat conservateur. He chaired the Commission on Individual Liberty, where he sometimes opposed Napoleon's demands. In 1814, he voted for the deposition of the emperor. After the Restoration, he was raised to the hereditary peerage as a count by Louis XVIII in 1817. He died in 1825.

== Publications ==
He published a number of legal and political works:

- Considérations sur la Constitution d'état du Dauphiné applicables aux Etats généraux (Considerations on the constitution of the states of Dauphiné applicable to the States General), 1789
- De l'Esprit de constitution qui convient le mieux à la France (On the Spirit of Constitution best suited to France), 1795
- Coup d’œil raisonné sur les assemblées primaires de Paris (A reasoned look at the primary assemblies of Paris), 1795
