= Pierre Jean-Marie Sotin de La Coindière =

Pierre Jean Marie Sotin de la Coindière (Nantes, 1764 - La Chevrolière, 1810) was Minister of Police under the Directory.

== Biography ==
Lord of Coindière in Héric, he was the son of Pierre Sotin, Lord of Coindière, lawyer in the parliament of Brittany and trade advisor, seneschal of the commandery of Saint-Jean and his wife Sainte-Catherine de Nantes, and of Marie-Anne Lafiton.

He himself was a lawyer in the Parlement of Rennes at the beginning of the French Revolution and became president of the Administration of Loire-Inférieure. He narrowly escaped the drownings at Nantes, and came to Paris where, on the recommendation of Philippe-Antoine Merlin de Douai, he was appointed on 8 Thermidor, year V (July 26, 1797) Minister of Police. Devoted to Paul Barras, he was one of the authors of the Coup of 18 Fructidor Year V (September 4, 1797). He resigned on 25 Pluviôse, year VI (February 12, 1798) and was appointed first ambassador to Genoa and then consul in New York. He was a theophilanthropist.
