= Charles Levert =

French public servant and politician

Charles-Alphonse Levert
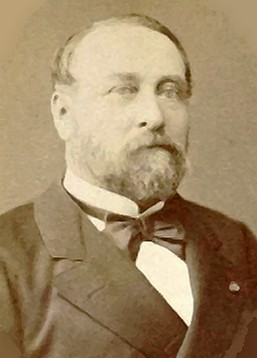

Representative of Pas-de-Calais
- In office 7 January 1872 – 7 March 1876

Deputy of Pas-de-Calais
- In office 20 February 1876 – 14 October 1889

Personal details
- Born: 11 June 1825 Sens, Yonne
- Died: 6 June 1899 (aged 73) Paris, France
- Occupation: Public servant and politician

Charles-Alphonse Levert (11 June 1825 – 6 April 1899) was a French public servant and politician. During the Second French Empire he was a prefect of various departments. During the French Third Republic he served as deputy for Pas-de-Calais between 1872 and 1889. He held right-wing Bonapartist views and consistently voted against the republican governments.

== Early years ==
Charles-Alphonse Levert was born on 11 June 1825 in Sens, Yonne. His parents were Antoine Levert (1793–1865) and Caroline Colombe Tarbé (1800–1847). He studied at the Collège Sainte-Barbe in Paris. In the French Revolution of 1848 he declared for the republicans. He joined the administration as secretary of Émile Ollivier, Commissioner General of the Provisional Government in Bouches-du-Rhône. He was adviser to the prefecture of Arras in 1850–51. He joined the cause of Prince Louis-Napoleon Bonaparte.

== Second Empire ==
After the coup d'état of 2 December 1951 Levert was named sub-prefect of Saint-Omer thanks to the influence of his uncle Pierre Carlier^{(fr)}, prefect of police of Paris at the time of the coup d'état. He was appointed sub-prefect of Saint-Omer on 6 December 1851. He became known for his strong action against the republicans. Under the Second French Empire he was in turn sub-prefect of Valenciennes (1856) and prefect of Ardèche. On 25 June 1857 he married Elise Canonne (1836–1923). Their son Maurice was followed by their daughter Caroline Fathima in 1859. (Note: Caroline Fatma Levert was born in Algiers. On 27 March 1878 she married the deputy Albert Sarlande^{(fr)} in Paris, former chief of staff of her father when he was prefect of Bouches-du-Rhone.) Levert was prefect at Algiers from October 1859 to December 1860, when he was replaced by Nicolas Mercier-Lacombe^{(fr)}. In Algiers he had to fight sharp opposition in the local press by Clément Duvernois^{(fr)}.

In 1861 Levert was prefect of Vienne, in 1864 prefect of Loire, then he was prefect of Pas-de-Calais (1864–66) and finally prefect of Bouches-du-Rhone. Levert was appointed Commander of the Legion of Honour on 14 August 1867. He succeeded Senator Charlemagne de Maupas as prefect of Bouches-du-Rhone at Marseille in 1866 at a time of growing republican agitation. With relaxation of the press laws on 11 May 1868, new opposition daily newspapers like Le Phare de Marseille and Le Peuple started to flourish. During the revolution of 4 September 1870 Levert tried to resist a crowd of 5,000 people who invaded the prefecture in Marseille. He was badly injured and went into hiding for twelve hours. He managed to escape to Belgium, then went to stay close to Napoleon III at Schloss Wilhelmshöhe.

== Third Republic ==
After the end of the Franco-Prussian War and the conclusion of peace Levert returned to France and ran for election to the National Assembly in a by-election in Pas-de-Calais on 7 January 1872 to succeed General Louis Faidherbe, who had resigned. He ran as a Bonapartist, and received 74,629 votes against 57,248 votes for his republican opponent. In the Assembly he sat with the Appel au peuple parliamentary group. He voted for the resignation of Adolphe Thiers on 24 May 1873 and abstained from the vote on the presidential septennat (seven-year mandate). In 1874 he was awarded an annual pension of 6,000 francs as a former prefect, with payment of arrears of over 18,000 francs. This caused an outcry in the democratic press. He voted against the ministry of Albert de Broglie on 16 May 1874, for the dissolution of the Chamber, against Henri-Alexandre Wallon's amendment to the constitutional laws, for Pascal Pierre Duprat's amendment and against the constitutional laws. His term ended on 7 March 1876.

On 30 January 1876 Levert ran for election as senator of Pas-de-Calais, but failed when the Legitimists formed an alliance with the Republicans against Levert in the third round. On 20 February 1876 he was elected as deputy in the 2nd district of Saint-Omer. He continued to follow a Bonapartist line, did little to support the government during the 16 May 1877 crisis, and abstained from the vote of no confidence against the Broglie-Fourtou cabinet. He was reelected on 14 October 1877 and again on 21 August 1881. He opposed the internal and external policies of the cabinets of Léon Gambetta and Jules Ferry and voted against the Tonkin credits. On 4 October 1885 he was elected on the conservative list of Pas-de-Calais and continued to side with the right wing of the Bonapartist group. He voted against reinstatement of the district poll on 11 February 1889, for indefinite postponement of revision of the Constitution, against the prosecution of three members of the Ligue des Patriotes, against the draft Lisbonne law restricting freedom of the press and against prosecution of General Boulanger.

Levert ran for reelection in September 1889 for the 2nd district of Saint-Omer, but was defeated. His last term ended on 14 October 1889. After this he abandoned politics. Charles Levert died on 6 April 1899 in Paris.

== Sources ==
- Charles, Alphonse Levert (in French), Assemblée nationale
- Garric, Alain, "Alphonse Charles LEVERT", geneanet (in French)
- Guillaume, Sylvie (1998), Dictionnaire des parlementaires d'Aquitaine sous la Troisième République (in French), Presses Univ de Bordeaux, ISBN 978-2-86781-231-6
- Greenberg, Louis M. (1971), Sisters of Liberty: Marseille, Lyon, Paris, and the Reaction to a Centralized State, 1868-1871, Harvard University Press, ISBN 978-0-674-81000-6
- Hilaire, Yves Marie (1977), Atlas électoral Nord, Pas-de-Calais, 1876-1936: Troisième République (in French), Presses Univ. Septentrion, ISBN 978-2-85939-063-1
- Jolly, Jean (1960–1977), "LEVERT, CHARLES, ALPHONSE", Dictionnaire des parlementaires français de 1889 à 1940 (in French), Paris: Éditeur : Presses universitaires de France, ISBN 2-1100-1998-0
- Morineau, Michel (1985), Incroyables gazettes et fabuleux métaux: Les retours des trésors américains d'après les gazettes hollandaises, 16e-18e siècles (in French), Les Editions de la MSH, ISBN 978-2-7351-0112-2
- Robert, Adolphe; Cougny, Gaston (1889–1891), "LEVERT (CHARLES ALPHONSE)", in Edgar Bourloton (ed.), Dictionnaire des Parlementaires français (1789–1889) (in French)
