= Government of the first Bourbon restoration =

Government of the First Bourbon Restoration
- Cabinet of the Kingdom of France

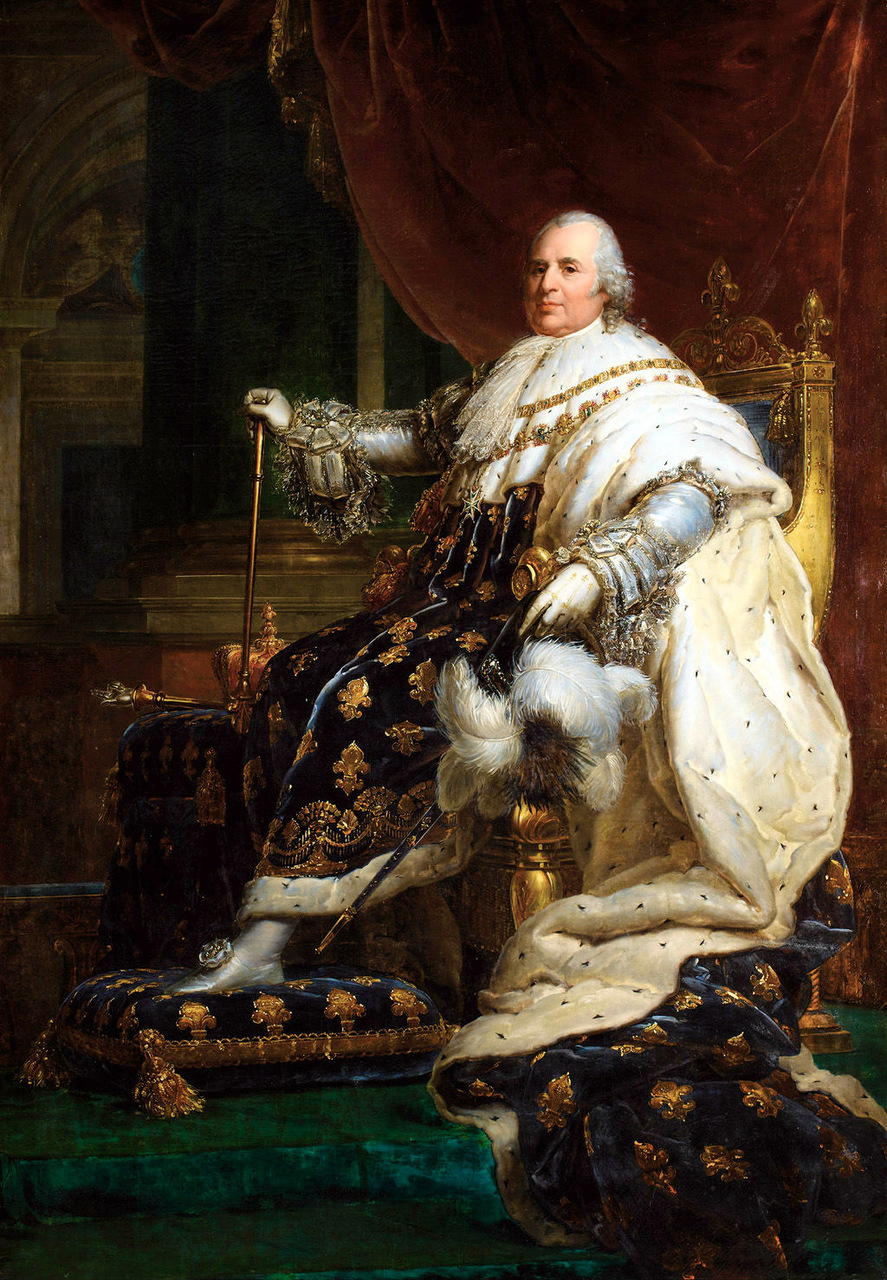
- Portrait of Louis XVIII by François Gérard
- Date formed: 13 May 1814
- Date dissolved: 19 March 1815

People and organisations
- Head of state: Louis XVIII

History
- Predecessor: French provisional government of 1814
- Successor: French Government of the Hundred Days

The Government of the first Bourbon restoration replaced the French provisional government of 1814 that had been formed after the fall of Napoleon. It was announced on 13 May 1814 by King Louis XVIII. After the return of Napoleon from exile, the court fled to Ghent and the government was replaced by the French Government of the Hundred Days on 20 March 1815.

== Formation ==
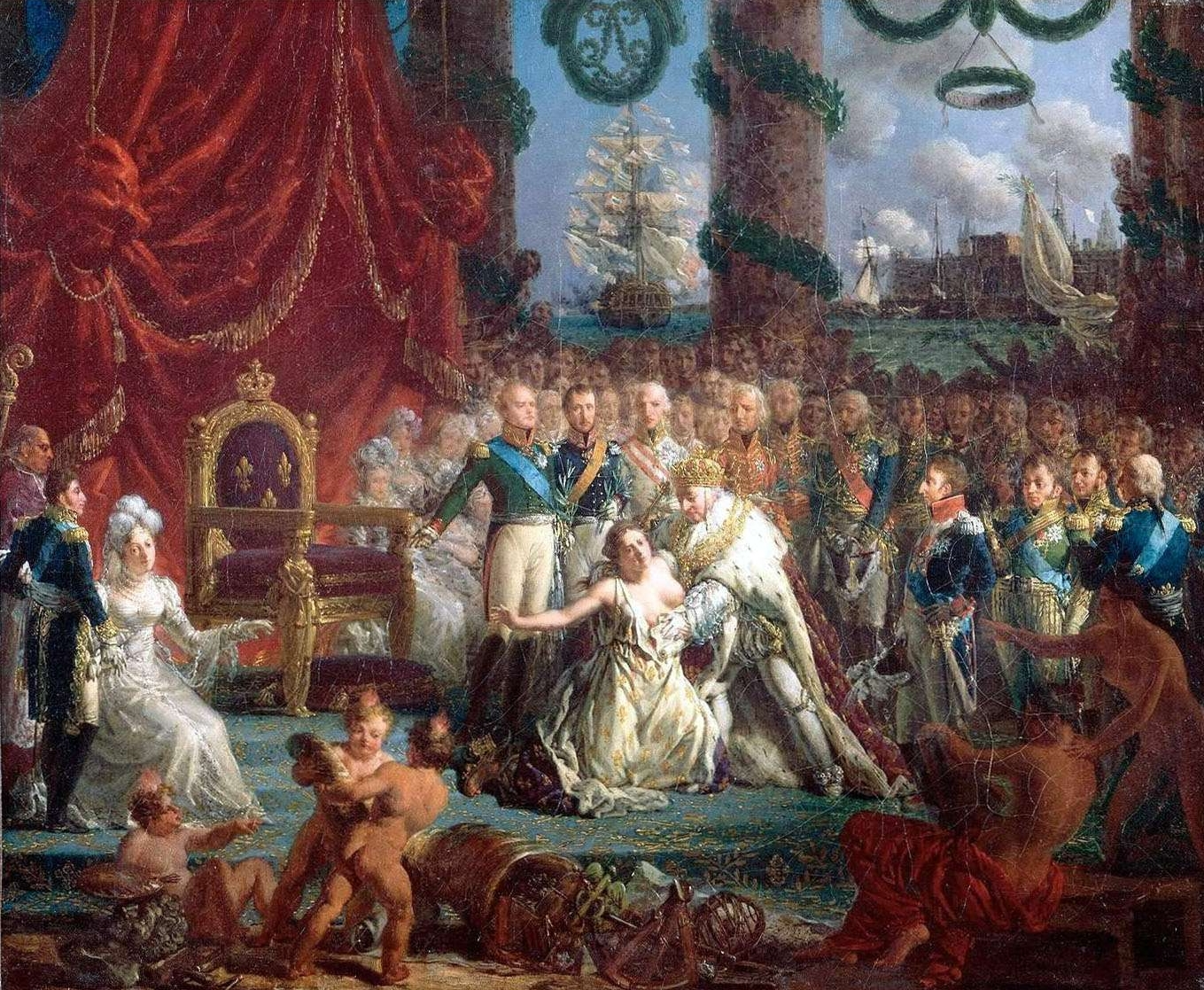
Allegory of the Return of the Bourbons on 24 April 1814 : Louis XVIII Lifting France from Its Ruins by Louis-Philippe Crépin

King Louis XVIII made a triumphal return to Paris on 3 May 1814, accompanied by members of the provisional Council of State, commissaires of the ministerial departments, Marshals of France, and generals. He was greeted by a huge crowd. He named the new ministry on 13 May 1814.

== Ministers ==
The ministers were:

Ministry	Start	End	Minister
Foreign Affairs	13 May 1814	19 March 1815	Charles Maurice de Talleyrand-Périgord
Justice	13 May 1814	19 March 1815	Charles Dambray
Interior	13 May 1814	19 March 1815	François-Xavier-Marc-Antoine de Montesquiou-Fézensac
War	13 May 1814	3 December 1814	Pierre Dupont de l'Étang
War	3 December 1814	11 March 1815	Jean-de-Dieu Soult
War	11 March 1815	19 March 1815	Henri Jacques Guillaume Clarke
Finance	13 May 1814	19 March 1815	Joseph-Dominique Louis
Navy and Colonies	13 May 1814	7 September 1814	Pierre-Victor Malouet
Navy and Colonies	7 September 1814	19 March 1815	Jacques Claude Beugnot
Minister of State	13 May 1814	19 March 1815	Emmerich Joseph de Dalberg
King's Household	29 May 1814	19 March 1815	Pierre Louis Jean Casimir de Blacas

== Events ==
On 4 June 1814 the Charter of 1814 was proclaimed, defining the basic constitutional laws of the state. The government soon became unpopular. Some were opposed to the reactionary policies of the government, and some were opposed to the Bourbon dynasty. The clergy openly preached intolerance and persecution of supporters of the former regime, while the army resented the rejection of their achievements under the Empire. Napoleon sensed the change of mood, left Elba and on 1 March 1815 landed on the mainland near Cannes. He traveled north, with supporters flocking to his cause. On 16 March 1815 Louis XVIII addressed a meeting of both chambers, appealing to them to defend the constitutional charter. On the night of 19-20 March the king left his palace for Ghent in Belgium. Napoleon entered Paris on 20 March 1815.
