= Jules Anglès =

French politician

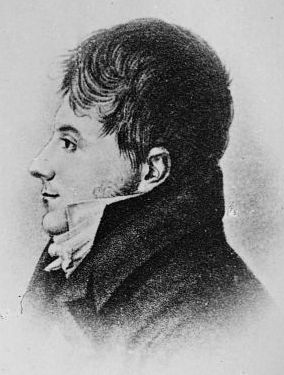
- Born: 28 July 1778; Grenoble, Isère, France
- Died: 16 January 1828 (aged 49); Chateau de Cornillon, Mably, Loire, France
- Occupation: Politician
- Known for: Minister of Police

Jules Jean Baptiste, comte Anglès (28 July 1778 – 16 January 1828) was a French politician who was Minister of Police for a short period in 1814.

== Early years ==
Jules Jean Baptiste Anglès was born in Grenoble, Isère, on 28 July 1778. His father was Jean-François Anglès (1736-1828), a lawyer and adviser to the Grand Chamber of the Parliament of Grenoble, who was arrested during the French Revolution and spent 18 months in jail before being released on 9 Thermidor (27 July 1794). Jules Jean Baptiste Anglès joined the École Polytechnique in December 1799.

== First Empire ==
Anglès became Auditor at the naval section of the Council of State on 11 February 1806. He was appointed Intendant in Silesia from December 1806, then in Salzburg in April 1809, and then was appointed intendant in Vienna on 27 July 1809. He was made maître des requêtes on 15 November 1809. The same day he was made a Baron of the Empire and given responsibility for general policing in the 3rd arrondissement of Paris. He was briefly Minister of Police in the provisional government of 1814.

== Bourbon Restoration ==
After the Ministry of the General Police was dissolved in May 1814 by the first Bourbon Restoration, Anglès was assigned to the Council of State. He was made a Councillor of State on 17 March 1815. On 20 March 1815 he followed King Louis XVIII to Ghent, where he edited the Moniteur Royaliste. After the second restoration, on 22 August 1815 he was elected deputy for Hautes-Alpes. He was appointed Minister of State to the Privy Council on 19 September 1815. From 29 September 1815 to 19 December 1821 he was Prefect of Police. He replaced Élie, duc Decazes, at the prefecture of police and was replaced by Guy Delavau.

Anglès died in his Chateau de Cornillon, Mably, Loire, on 16 January 1828, aged 49.
