= Fontaine-Denis-Nuisy =

- Commune
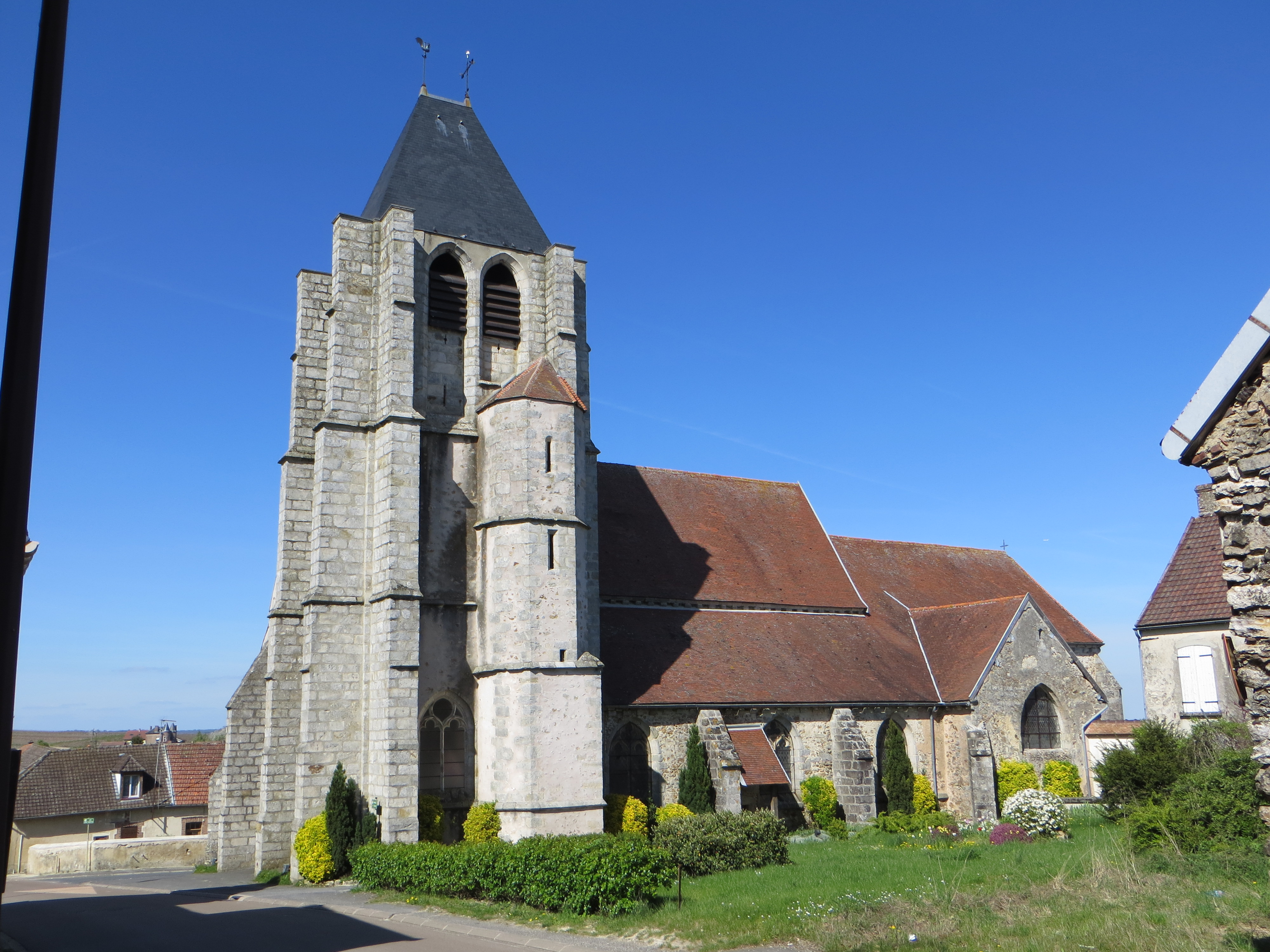
- The church in Fontaine-Denis
- Location of Fontaine-Denis-Nuisy
- Location within France Location within Grand Est
- Coordinates: 48°37′35″N 3°41′14″E
- Country: France
- Region: Grand Est
- Department: Marne
- Arrondissement: Épernay
- Canton: Sézanne-Brie et Champagne

Government
  - Mayor (2020–2026): Nadine Legras
- Area^{1}: 13.17 km^{2} (5.08 sq mi)
- Elevation: 125 m (410 ft)
- Population (2023): 237
  - Density: 18.0/km^{2} (46.6/sq mi)
- Time zone: UTC+01:00 (CET)
  - Summer (DST): UTC+02:00 (CEST)
- INSEE/Postal code: 51254 /51120
- ^{1} French Land Register data, which excludes lakes, ponds, glaciers > 1 km^{2} (0.386 sq mi or 247 acres) and river estuaries.

Fontaine-Denis-Nuisy is a commune in the Marne department in north-eastern France.

== See also ==
- Communes of the Marne department
