= French Provisional Government of 1814 =

- Cabinet of France

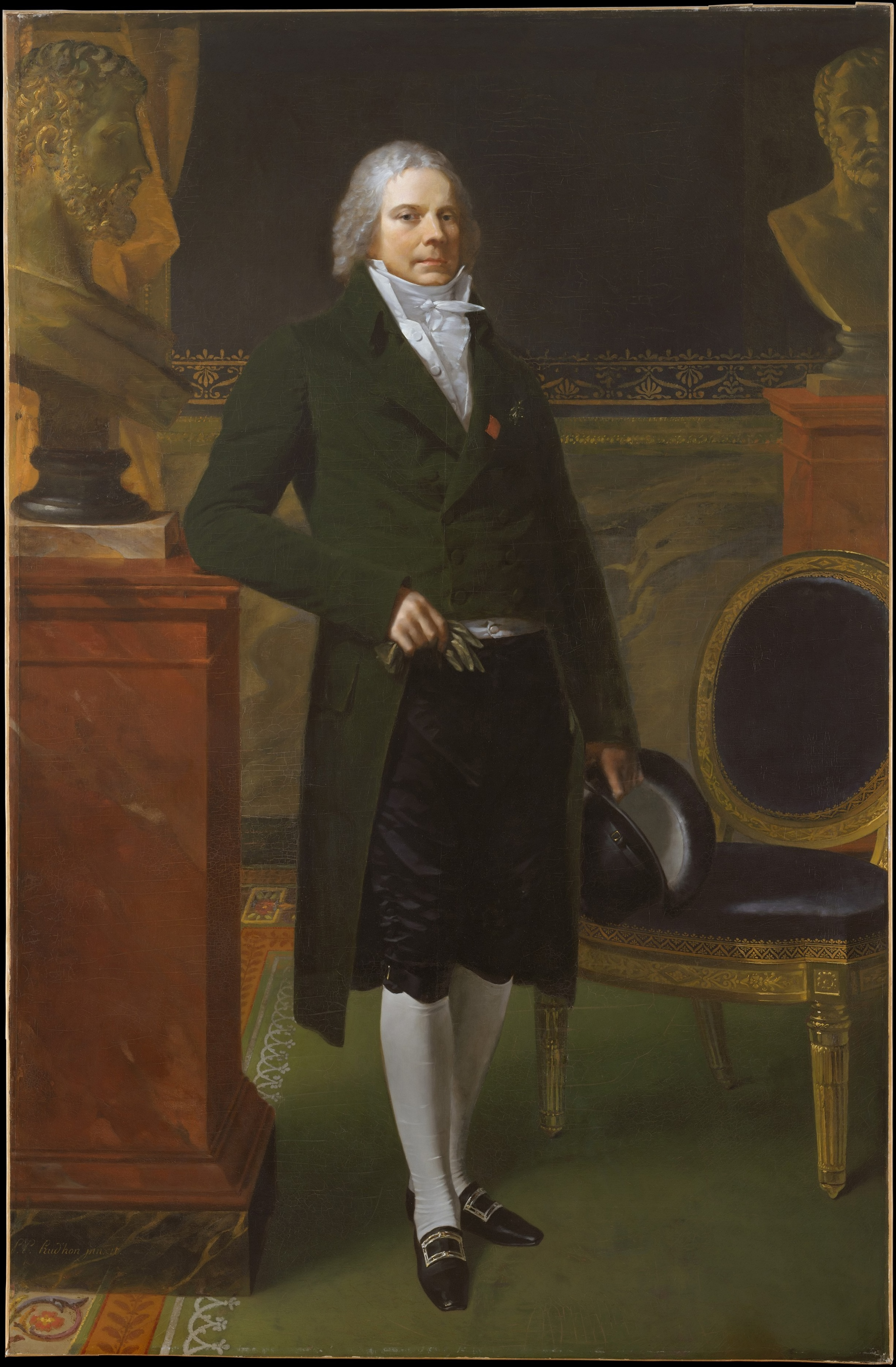
- Charles Maurice de Talleyrand-Périgord
- Date formed: 1 April 1814
- Date dissolved: 13 May 1814

People and organisations
- Head of state: Charles-Philippe of France(April 1st-May 3rd); Louis XVIII(3rd-13th May)
- Head of government: Charles Maurice de Talleyrand-Périgord

History
- Predecessor: First Cabinet of Napoleon I
- Successor: Government of the first Bourbon restoration

The French Provisional Government of 1814 held office during the transitional period between the defeat of Napoleon followed by the surrender of Paris on 31 March 1814 and the appointment on 13 May 1814 of the Government of the first Bourbon restoration by King Louis XVIII.

== Formation of the government ==
On 31 March 1814 Marshal Auguste de Marmont surrendered Paris to Emperor Alexander I of Russia, who entered the city the same day. Prince Charles Maurice de Talleyrand placed his house at the Emperor's disposal. The Senate met on 1 April 1814 and, in accordance with the views expressed by Alexander I, decreed the formation of a provisional government headed by Talleyrand. The members of the Provisional Government were:

- Charles Maurice de Talleyrand-Périgord (President)
- Pierre Riel de Beurnonville
- François de Jaucourt
- Emmerich Joseph de Dalberg
- François-Xavier-Marc-Antoine de Montesquiou-Fézensac

On 2 April the Senate declared that Napoleon and his family had been deposed.

== Ministers ==
The Provisional Government announced the appointment of commissaires to head the ministries on 3 April 1814. They were:

- Foreign Affairs: Antoine de Laforêt
- Justice: Pierre Paul Nicolas Henrion de Pansey
- Interior: Jacques Claude Beugnot
- War: Pierre Dupont de l'Étang
- Finance, Commerce and Industry: Joseph-Dominique Louis
- Navy and Colonies: Pierre-Victor Malouet
- Police: Jules Anglès
- Secretary-general: Dupont de Nemours

== Events ==
The Provisional Government drafted a constitution, which was approved unanimously by the Senate on 6 April 1814. It announced the Bourbon Restoration, declaring that Louis XVIII of France was king. Napoleon, who had retired to Fontainebleau, signed an act of abdication on 11 April 1814. He left Fontainebleau on 20 April 1814 for exile on the island of Elba. On 12 April 1814 Charles, Count of Artois, the king's brother, entered Paris. He was declared Lieutenant General of the kingdom on 14 April 1814. Louis XVIII had been watching events from Hartwell House in England. On 24 April 1814 he landed at Calais and on 3 April 1814 made a triumphal entry into Paris. He announced his government on 13 May 1814.
