= Jean-Pierre Duval =

French politician (1754–1817)

Jean-Pierre Duval, born February 20, 1754 in Rouen, died August 23, 1817 in Paris) was a politician of the French Revolution.

== Biography ==
In 1778, Jean-Pierre Duval became a lawyer in the Parlement of Rouen. In September 1792, while serving as clerk of the central office of justices of the peace in Rouen, Duval was elected deputy for the department of Seine-Inférieure, to the National Convention. During the trial of Louis XVI, he voted for detention and perpetual banishment, and spoke in favour of the appeal to the people and a stay of execution.He did not participate in the vote on the indictment of Jean-Paul Marat in April 1793, nor in the vote on the reestablishment of the Commission of Twelve in May of the same year.

Under the Directory, from 17 October 1795-15 May 1797 he was a member of the Council of Five Hundred, again representing Seine-Inférieure. He was Minister of Police from 29 October 1798 until 23 June 1799. During the Consulate, he sat, again for Seine-Inférieure, in the Corps législatif from 25 December 1799-1 July 1803, serving as its chair from 21 January-5 February 1800.

On 12 Pluviôse Year XIII (February 1, 1805) he was appointed prefect of the Basses-Alpes, stationed in Digne where he remained from 1805 to March 1815. He was confirmed in his position during the First Restoration and at the beginning of the Hundred Days. On Napoleon's return, at the beginning of March 1815, he did not organise any armed defense at Sisteron, which he considered impossible, but he hastened to accommodate both camps (Louis XVIII and the Emperor). He was then appointed by Napoleon on 6 April 6, 1815 to the prefecture of Charente, a post from which he was dismissed in July 1815 during the Second Restoration.
