= Charlemagne de Maupas =

French politician (1818–1888)

Charlemagne Émile de Maupas
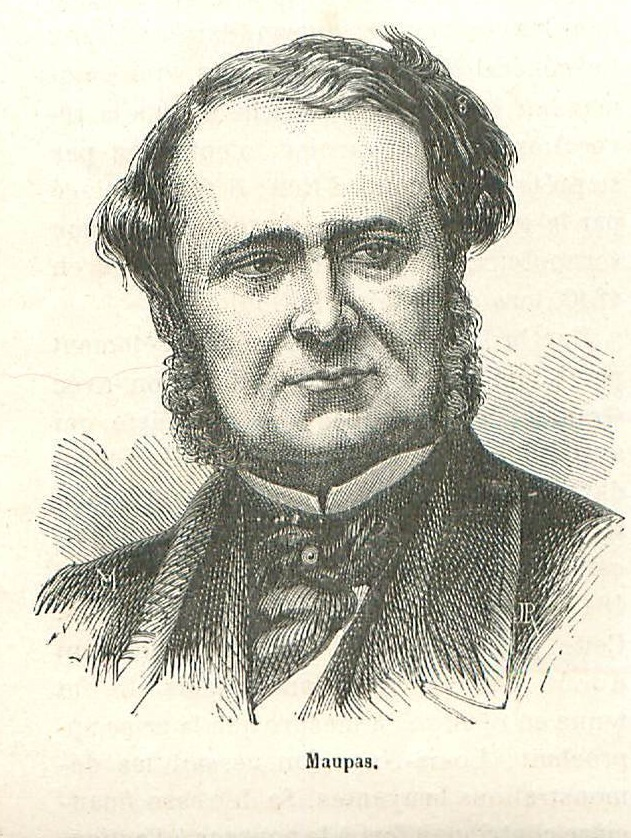
- Charlemagne Émile de Maupas
- Born: 8 December 1818; Bar-sur-Aube, Aube, France
- Died: 19 June 1888 (aged 69); Paris, France
- Occupations: Lawyer and politician
- Known for: Police chief during the 2 December 1851 coup

Charlemagne Émile de Maupas (8 December 1818 – 19 June 1888) was a French lawyer and politician who was head of the Parisian Police during the critical period when Napoleon III seized power in the coup of 2 December 1851.

== Early years ==
Charlemagne Émile de Maupas was born in Bar-sur-Aube, Aube, on 8 December 1818. He studied law in Paris. He entered the prefectural career as a sub-prefect of Uzès in 1845, then of Beaune in 1847. He returned to private life after the February Revolution of 1848. He attached himself to the Bonapartist party, and soon gained the confidence of Louis Napoleon Bonaparte. De Maupas was named in succession sub-prefect of Boulogne-sur-Mer (1849), prefect of Allier (1849) and prefect of Haute-Garonne (1850). He was noted for his zeal and lack of scruples. When prefect of Haute-Garonne he wanted to arrest enemies of the regime. The magistrate protested that there was no evidence. He replied that evidence would be created.

== December 1851 coup ==
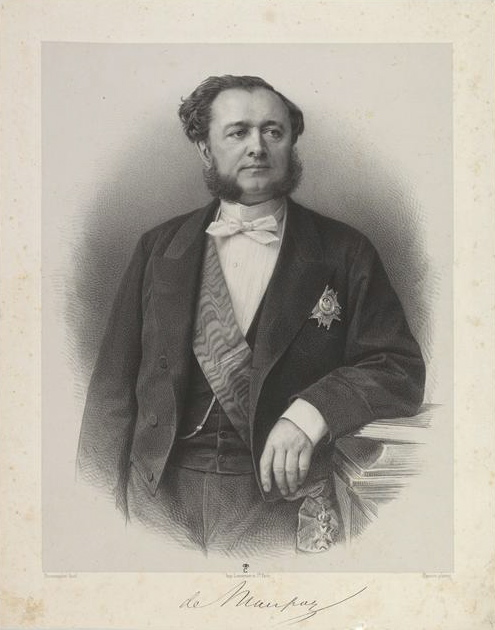
Lithograph of Charlemagne de Maupas

On 27 October 1851 Louis Napoleon appointed de Maupas to police headquarters in Paris. He replaced Carlier as head of the prefecture of the police. He was one of the leaders of the 2 December 1851 coup, along with Charles de Morny and Saint Arnaud. He disagreed with the tactic of letting the riots start before annihilating them. His preferred approach would have been to deploy the army in force in Paris to deter any attempt at resistance. Although there were risks of the troops fraternizing with the insurgents, his approach would have avoided bloodshed. In his first proclamation he warned the people of Paris not to resist in face of inflexible force, and that night arrested all who seemed most hostile to the coup.

== Later career ==
After the coup de Maupas was placed at the head of the Police Ministry, established on 22 January 1852. He took vigorous measures to arrest opponents of the regime, including several publicists whom he had deported to Africa. He extended the jurisdiction of the Police Commisariat to cover all towns in France. He used agents provocateurs freely, and was merciless in his treatment of opponents, particularly the press.

Eventually Napoleon III decided de Maupas was being excessively harsh. There was also mounting opposition from the Ministries of the Interior and War, which saw their authority being undermined. The Ministry of Police was suppressed on 10 June 1853. On 21 June 1853 de Maupas was given a seat in the senate, and then was sent to Naples as an ambassador. At the end of September 1860 he was made prefect of Bouches-du-Rhône. He resigned from this position in December 1866. He was succeeded by the less authoritarian Charles Levert.

After the Franco-Prussian War (19 July 1870 – 10 May 1871) and the fall of the Second French Empire, Charlemagne de Maupas returned to the Senate at the start of the French Third Republic. He ran unsuccessfully for deputy in 1876 and 1877. He died in Paris on 19 June 1888, aged 69.

== Sources ==
- Choisel, Francis (1990). "Charlemagne de Maupas". In B. Yvert (ed.). Le Dictionnaire des Ministres. Perrin.
- Greenberg, Louis M. (1971), Sisters of Liberty: Marseille, Lyon, Paris, and the Reaction to a Centralized State, 1868-1871, Harvard University Press, ISBN 978-0-674-81000-6
- "Maupas, Charlemagne Émile de". Encyclopædia Universalis.
- Robert, Adolphe; Bourloton, Edgar; Cougny, Gaston (1891). Dictionnaire des parlementaires français de 1789 à 1889. Vol. 4.
