= Pluviôse =

5th month in the French Republican calendar

Pluviôse (French pronunciation: [plyvjoz]; also Pluviose) was the fifth month in the French Republican Calendar. The month was named after the Latin word pluviosus 'rainy'.

Pluviôse was the second month of the winter quarter (mois d'hiver), starting between the 20th and 22 January, and ending between the 18th and 20 February. It follows Nivôse and precedes Ventôse.

On October 24, 1793 Fabre d'Églantine suggested new names for the French Republican Calendar, and on the 24th November the National Convention accepted the names with minor changes. It was decided to omit the circumflex (accent circonflexe) in the names of the winter months, so the month was named Pluviose instead of Pluviôse. However, in historiography the spelling Pluviôse is still preferred.

Year: 3
Month: Pluviôse
Year: III

Day of the 10-day
week (décade)
Primidi
Duodi
Tridi
Quartidi
Quintidi
Sextidi
Septidi
Octidi
Nonidi
Décadi

décade 13
1	Tuesday; 20 January 1795
2	Wednesday; 21 January 1795
3	Thursday; 22 January 1795
4	Friday; 23 January 1795
5	Saturday; 24 January 1795
6	Sunday; 25 January 1795
7	Monday; 26 January 1795
8	Tuesday; 27 January 1795
9	Wednesday; 28 January 1795
10	Thursday; 29 January 1795

décade 14
11	Friday; 30 January 1795
12	Saturday; 31 January 1795
13	Sunday; 1 February 1795
14	Monday; 2 February 1795
15	Tuesday; 3 February 1795
16	Wednesday; 4 February 1795
17	Thursday; 5 February 1795
18	Friday; 6 February 1795
19	Saturday; 7 February 1795
20	Sunday; 8 February 1795

décade 15
21	Monday; 9 February 1795
22	Tuesday; 10 February 1795
23	Wednesday; 11 February 1795
24	Thursday; 12 February 1795
25	Friday; 13 February 1795
26	Saturday; 14 February 1795
27	Sunday; 15 February 1795
28	Monday; 16 February 1795
29	Tuesday; 17 February 1795
30	Wednesday; 18 February 1795

Decimal time – 10 h/day
Paris
9h72m87s

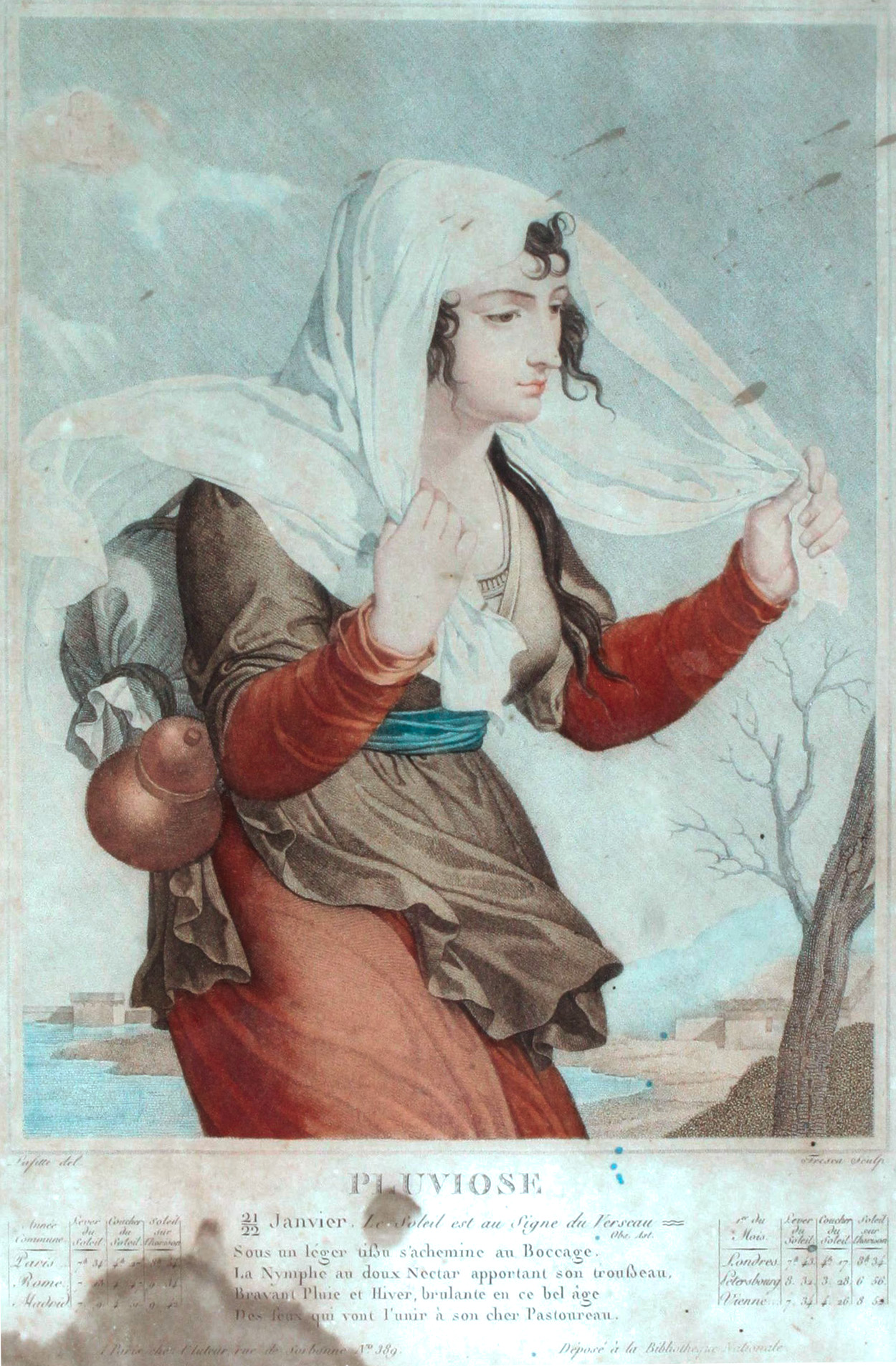
Pluviôse

23:11:35
Time of day - 24 h/day
Greenwich

Conversion between Republican and Gregorian calendar for the years I - XIV

Year: 1
Month: Pluviôse
Year: I

Day of the 10-day
week (décade)
Primidi
Duodi
Tridi
Quartidi
Quintidi
Sextidi
Septidi
Octidi
Nonidi
Décadi

décade 13
1	Sunday; 20 January 1793
2	Monday; 21 January 1793
3	Tuesday; 22 January 1793
4	Wednesday; 23 January 1793
5	Thursday; 24 January 1793
6	Friday; 25 January 1793
7	Saturday; 26 January 1793
8	Sunday; 27 January 1793
9	Monday; 28 January 1793
10	Tuesday; 29 January 1793

décade 14
11	Wednesday; 30 January 1793
12	Thursday; 31 January 1793
13	Friday; 1 February 1793
14	Saturday; 2 February 1793
15	Sunday; 3 February 1793
16	Monday; 4 February 1793
17	Tuesday; 5 February 1793
18	Wednesday; 6 February 1793
19	Thursday; 7 February 1793
20	Friday; 8 February 1793

décade 15
21	Saturday; 9 February 1793
22	Sunday; 10 February 1793
23	Monday; 11 February 1793
24	Tuesday; 12 February 1793
25	Wednesday; 13 February 1793
26	Thursday; 14 February 1793
27	Friday; 15 February 1793
28	Saturday; 16 February 1793
29	Sunday; 17 February 1793
30	Monday; 18 February 1793

Decimal time – 10 h/day
Paris
9:66:37

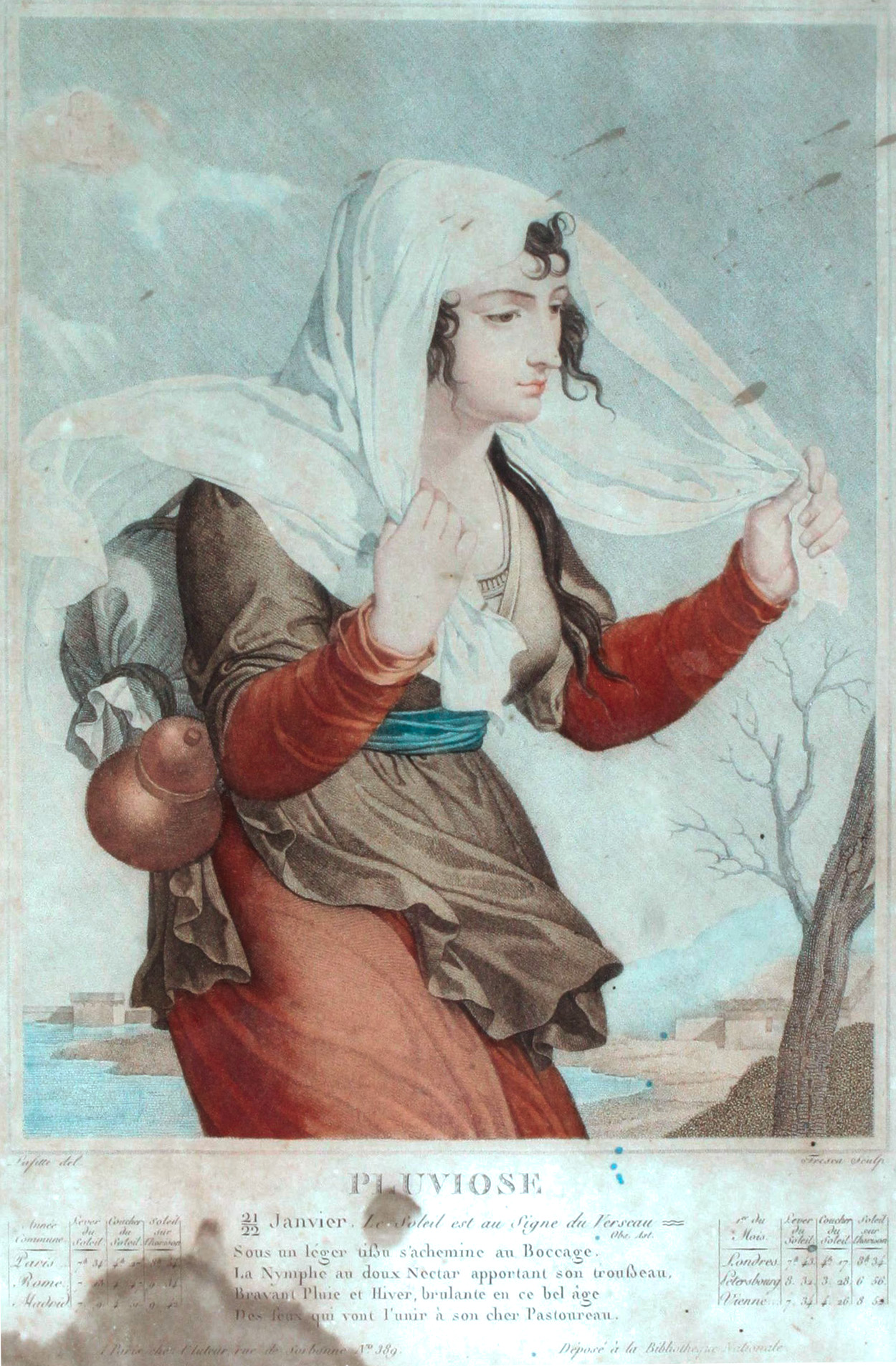
Pluviôse

23:11:35
Time of day - 24 h/day
Greenwich

Year: 2
Month: Pluviôse
Year: II

Day of the 10-day
week (décade)
Primidi
Duodi
Tridi
Quartidi
Quintidi
Sextidi
Septidi
Octidi
Nonidi
Décadi

décade 13
1	Monday; 20 January 1794
2	Tuesday; 21 January 1794
3	Wednesday; 22 January 1794
4	Thursday; 23 January 1794
5	Friday; 24 January 1794
6	Saturday; 25 January 1794
7	Sunday; 26 January 1794
8	Monday; 27 January 1794
9	Tuesday; 28 January 1794
10	Wednesday; 29 January 1794

décade 14
11	Thursday; 30 January 1794
12	Friday; 31 January 1794
13	Saturday; 1 February 1794
14	Sunday; 2 February 1794
15	Monday; 3 February 1794
16	Tuesday; 4 February 1794
17	Wednesday; 5 February 1794
18	Thursday; 6 February 1794
19	Friday; 7 February 1794
20	Saturday; 8 February 1794

décade 15
21	Sunday; 9 February 1794
22	Monday; 10 February 1794
23	Tuesday; 11 February 1794
24	Wednesday; 12 February 1794
25	Thursday; 13 February 1794
26	Friday; 14 February 1794
27	Saturday; 15 February 1794
28	Sunday; 16 February 1794
29	Monday; 17 February 1794
30	Tuesday; 18 February 1794

Decimal time – 10 h/day
Paris
9:66:37

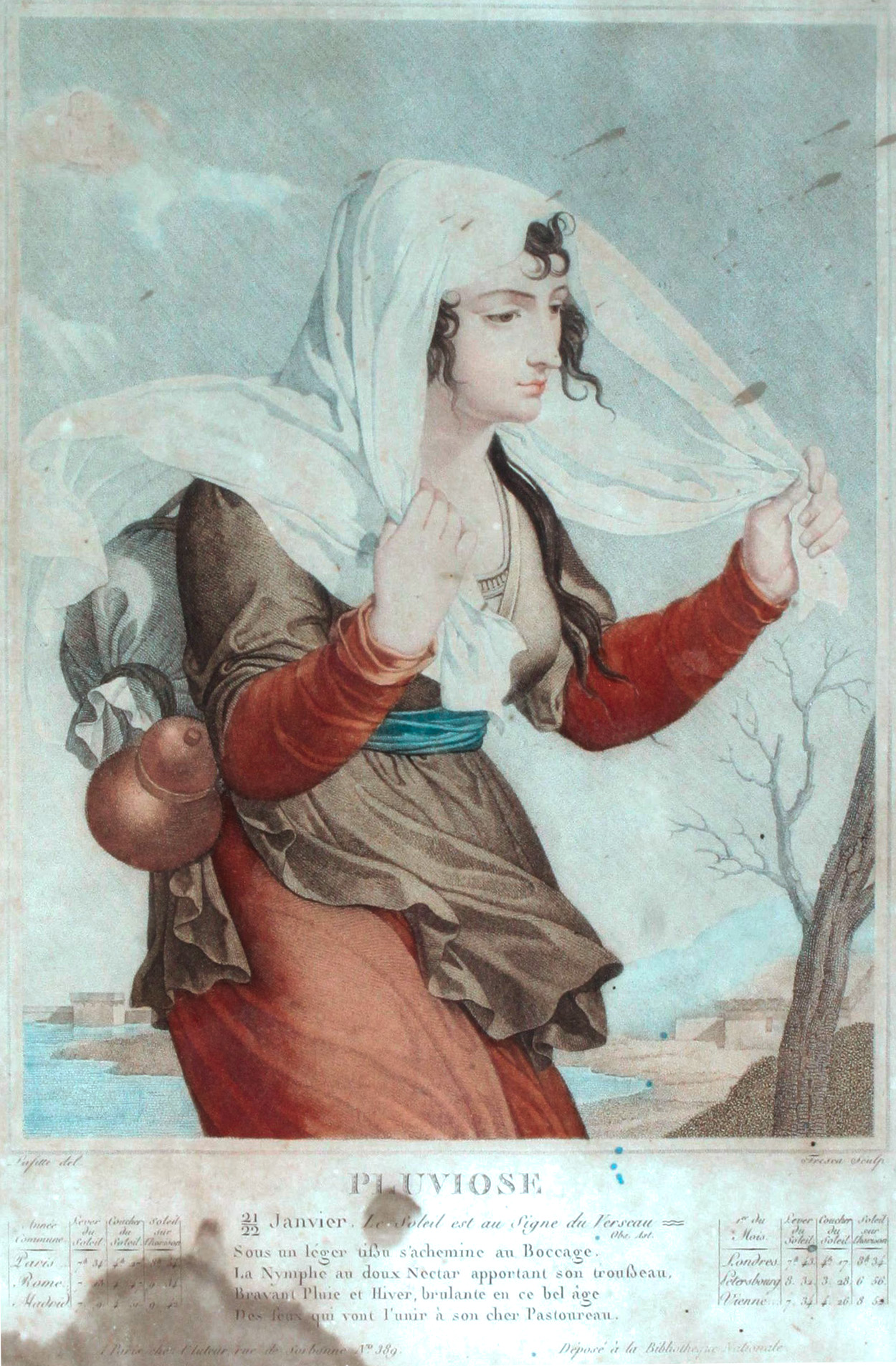
Pluviôse

23:11:35
Time of day - 24 h/day
Greenwich

Year: 3
Month: Pluviôse
Year: III

Day of the 10-day
week (décade)
Primidi
Duodi
Tridi
Quartidi
Quintidi
Sextidi
Septidi
Octidi
Nonidi
Décadi

décade 13
1	Tuesday; 20 January 1795
2	Wednesday; 21 January 1795
3	Thursday; 22 January 1795
4	Friday; 23 January 1795
5	Saturday; 24 January 1795
6	Sunday; 25 January 1795
7	Monday; 26 January 1795
8	Tuesday; 27 January 1795
9	Wednesday; 28 January 1795
10	Thursday; 29 January 1795

décade 14
11	Friday; 30 January 1795
12	Saturday; 31 January 1795
13	Sunday; 1 February 1795
14	Monday; 2 February 1795
15	Tuesday; 3 February 1795
16	Wednesday; 4 February 1795
17	Thursday; 5 February 1795
18	Friday; 6 February 1795
19	Saturday; 7 February 1795
20	Sunday; 8 February 1795

décade 15
21	Monday; 9 February 1795
22	Tuesday; 10 February 1795
23	Wednesday; 11 February 1795
24	Thursday; 12 February 1795
25	Friday; 13 February 1795
26	Saturday; 14 February 1795
27	Sunday; 15 February 1795
28	Monday; 16 February 1795
29	Tuesday; 17 February 1795
30	Wednesday; 18 February 1795

Decimal time – 10 h/day
Paris
9:66:37

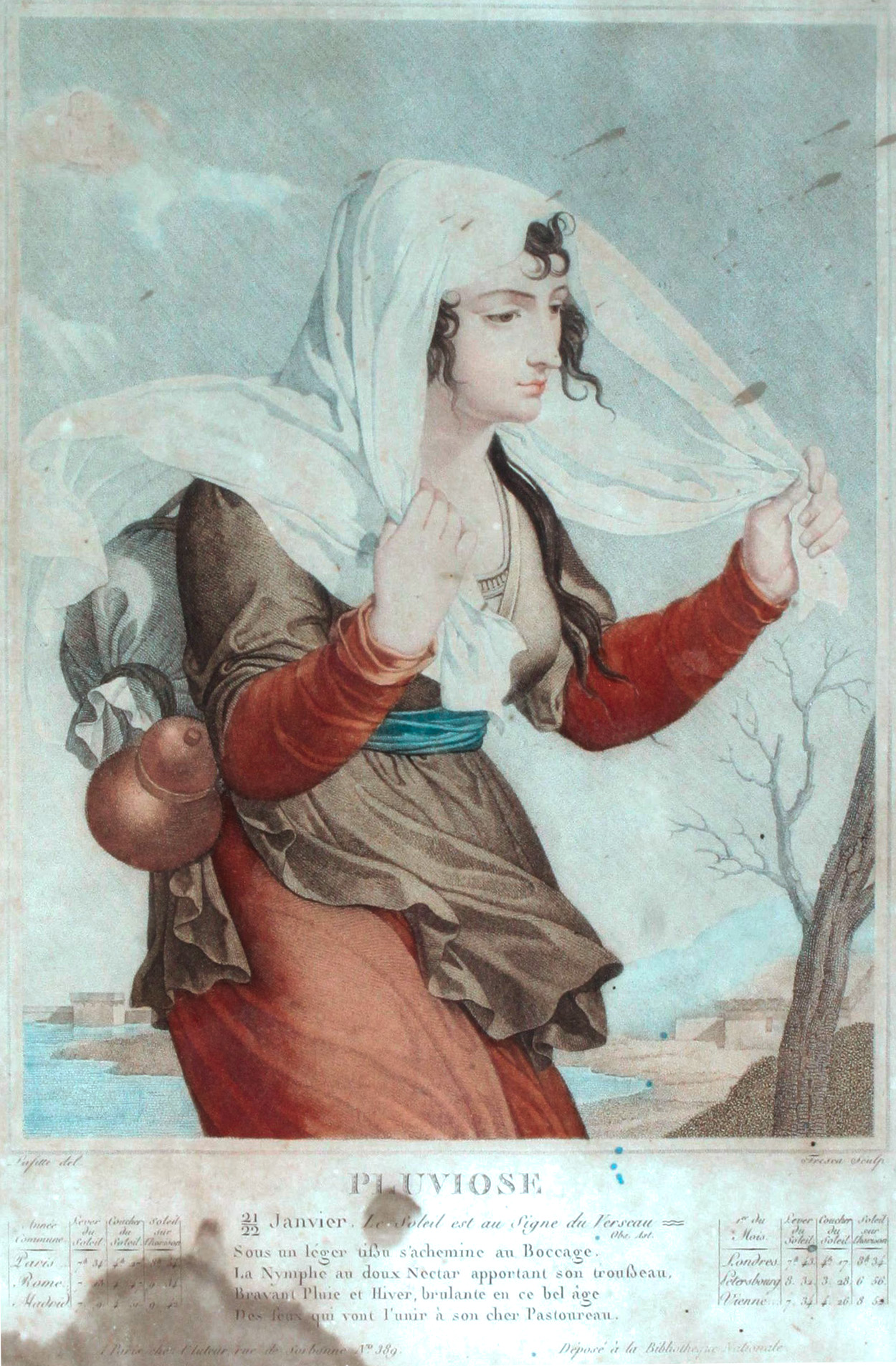
Pluviôse

23:11:35
Time of day - 24 h/day
Greenwich

Year: 4
Month: Pluviôse
Year: IV

Day of the 10-day
week (décade)
Primidi
Duodi
Tridi
Quartidi
Quintidi
Sextidi
Septidi
Octidi
Nonidi
Décadi

décade 13
1	Thursday; 21 January 1796
2	Friday; 22 January 1796
3	Saturday; 23 January 1796
4	Sunday; 24 January 1796
5	Monday; 25 January 1796
6	Tuesday; 26 January 1796
7	Wednesday; 27 January 1796
8	Thursday; 28 January 1796
9	Friday; 29 January 1796
10	Saturday; 30 January 1796

décade 14
11	Sunday; 31 January 1796
12	Monday; 1 February 1796
13	Tuesday; 2 February 1796
14	Wednesday; 3 February 1796
15	Thursday; 4 February 1796
16	Friday; 5 February 1796
17	Saturday; 6 February 1796
18	Sunday; 7 February 1796
19	Monday; 8 February 1796
20	Tuesday; 9 February 1796

décade 15
21	Wednesday; 10 February 1796
22	Thursday; 11 February 1796
23	Friday; 12 February 1796
24	Saturday; 13 February 1796
25	Sunday; 14 February 1796
26	Monday; 15 February 1796
27	Tuesday; 16 February 1796
28	Wednesday; 17 February 1796
29	Thursday; 18 February 1796
30	Friday; 19 February 1796

Decimal time – 10 h/day
Paris
9:66:37

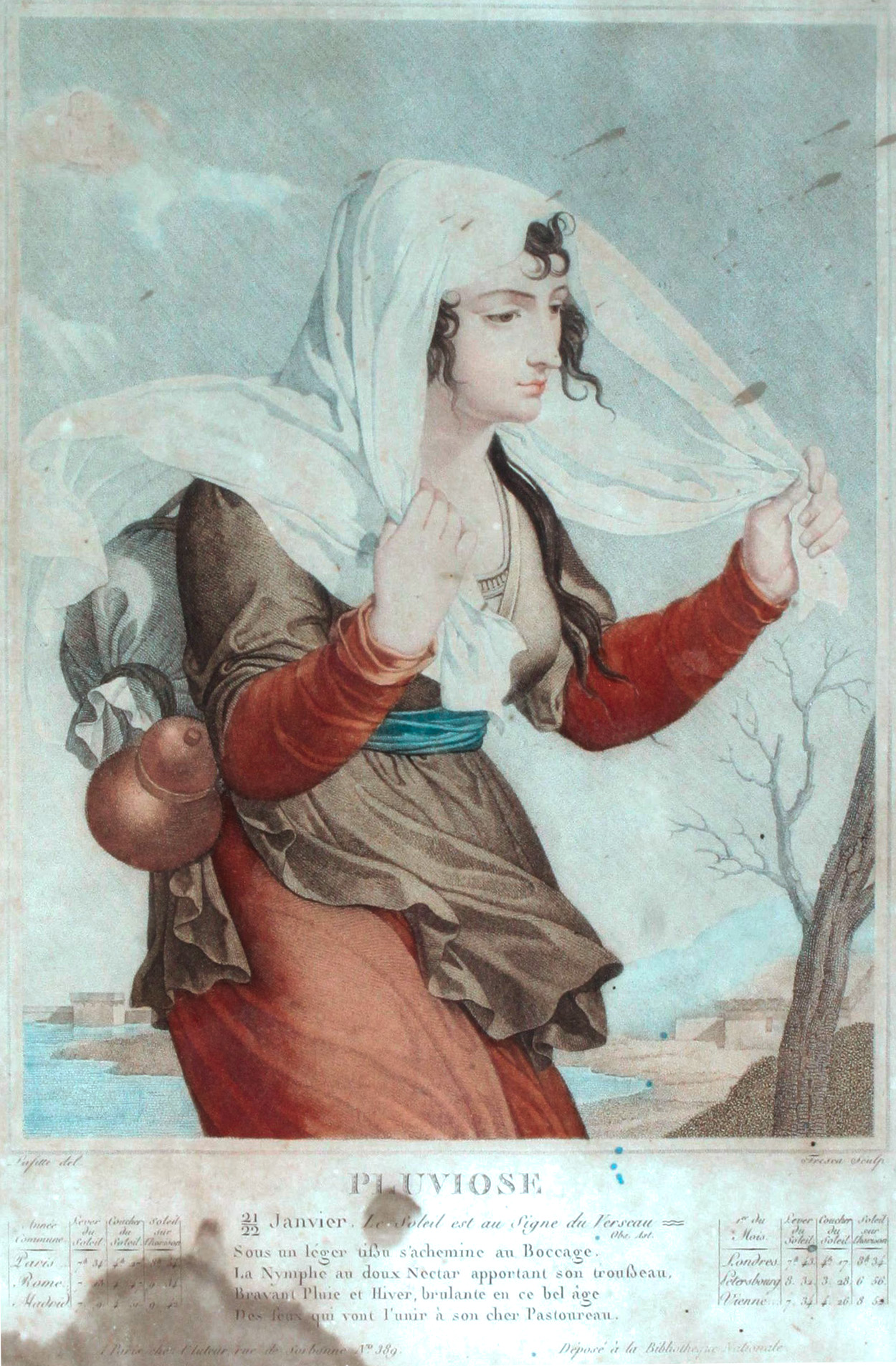
Pluviôse

23:11:35
Time of day - 24 h/day
Greenwich

Year: 5
Month: Pluviôse
Year: V

Day of the 10-day
week (décade)
Primidi
Duodi
Tridi
Quartidi
Quintidi
Sextidi
Septidi
Octidi
Nonidi
Décadi

décade 13
1	Friday; 20 January 1797
2	Saturday; 21 January 1797
3	Sunday; 22 January 1797
4	Monday; 23 January 1797
5	Tuesday; 24 January 1797
6	Wednesday; 25 January 1797
7	Thursday; 26 January 1797
8	Friday; 27 January 1797
9	Saturday; 28 January 1797
10	Sunday; 29 January 1797

décade 14
11	Monday; 30 January 1797
12	Tuesday; 31 January 1797
13	Wednesday; 1 February 1797
14	Thursday; 2 February 1797
15	Friday; 3 February 1797
16	Saturday; 4 February 1797
17	Sunday; 5 February 1797
18	Monday; 6 February 1797
19	Tuesday; 7 February 1797
20	Wednesday; 8 February 1797

décade 15
21	Thursday; 9 February 1797
22	Friday; 10 February 1797
23	Saturday; 11 February 1797
24	Sunday; 12 February 1797
25	Monday; 13 February 1797
26	Tuesday; 14 February 1797
27	Wednesday; 15 February 1797
28	Thursday; 16 February 1797
29	Friday; 17 February 1797
30	Saturday; 18 February 1797

Decimal time – 10 h/day
Paris
9:66:37

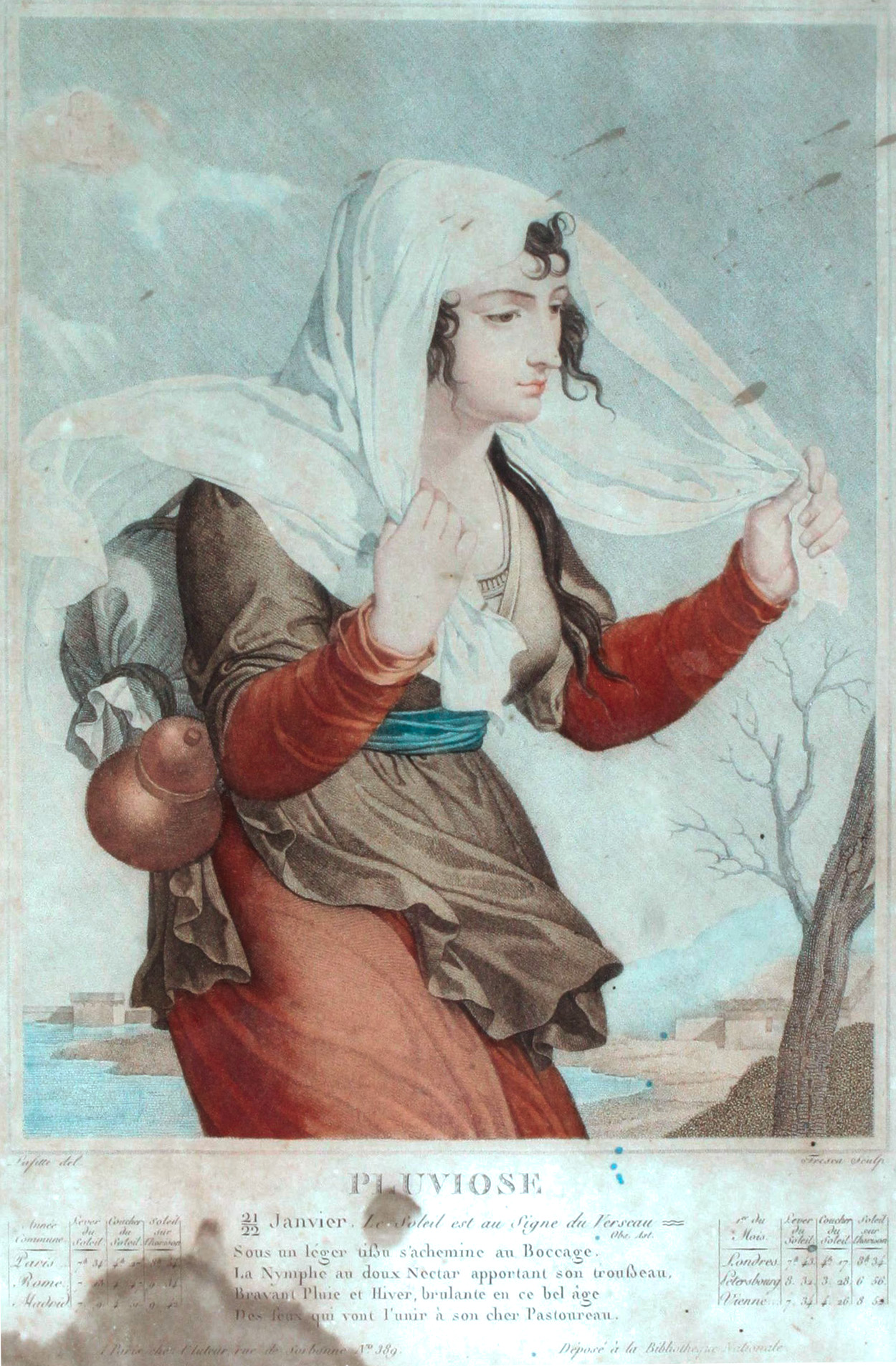
Pluviôse

23:11:35
Time of day - 24 h/day
Greenwich

Year: 6
Month: Pluviôse
Year: VI

Day of the 10-day
week (décade)
Primidi
Duodi
Tridi
Quartidi
Quintidi
Sextidi
Septidi
Octidi
Nonidi
Décadi

décade 13
1	Saturday; 20 January 1798
2	Sunday; 21 January 1798
3	Monday; 22 January 1798
4	Tuesday; 23 January 1798
5	Wednesday; 24 January 1798
6	Thursday; 25 January 1798
7	Friday; 26 January 1798
8	Saturday; 27 January 1798
9	Sunday; 28 January 1798
10	Monday; 29 January 1798

décade 14
11	Tuesday; 30 January 1798
12	Wednesday; 31 January 1798
13	Thursday; 1 February 1798
14	Friday; 2 February 1798
15	Saturday; 3 February 1798
16	Sunday; 4 February 1798
17	Monday; 5 February 1798
18	Tuesday; 6 February 1798
19	Wednesday; 7 February 1798
20	Thursday; 8 February 1798

décade 15
21	Friday; 9 February 1798
22	Saturday; 10 February 1798
23	Sunday; 11 February 1798
24	Monday; 12 February 1798
25	Tuesday; 13 February 1798
26	Wednesday; 14 February 1798
27	Thursday; 15 February 1798
28	Friday; 16 February 1798
29	Saturday; 17 February 1798
30	Sunday; 18 February 1798

Decimal time – 10 h/day
Paris
9:66:37

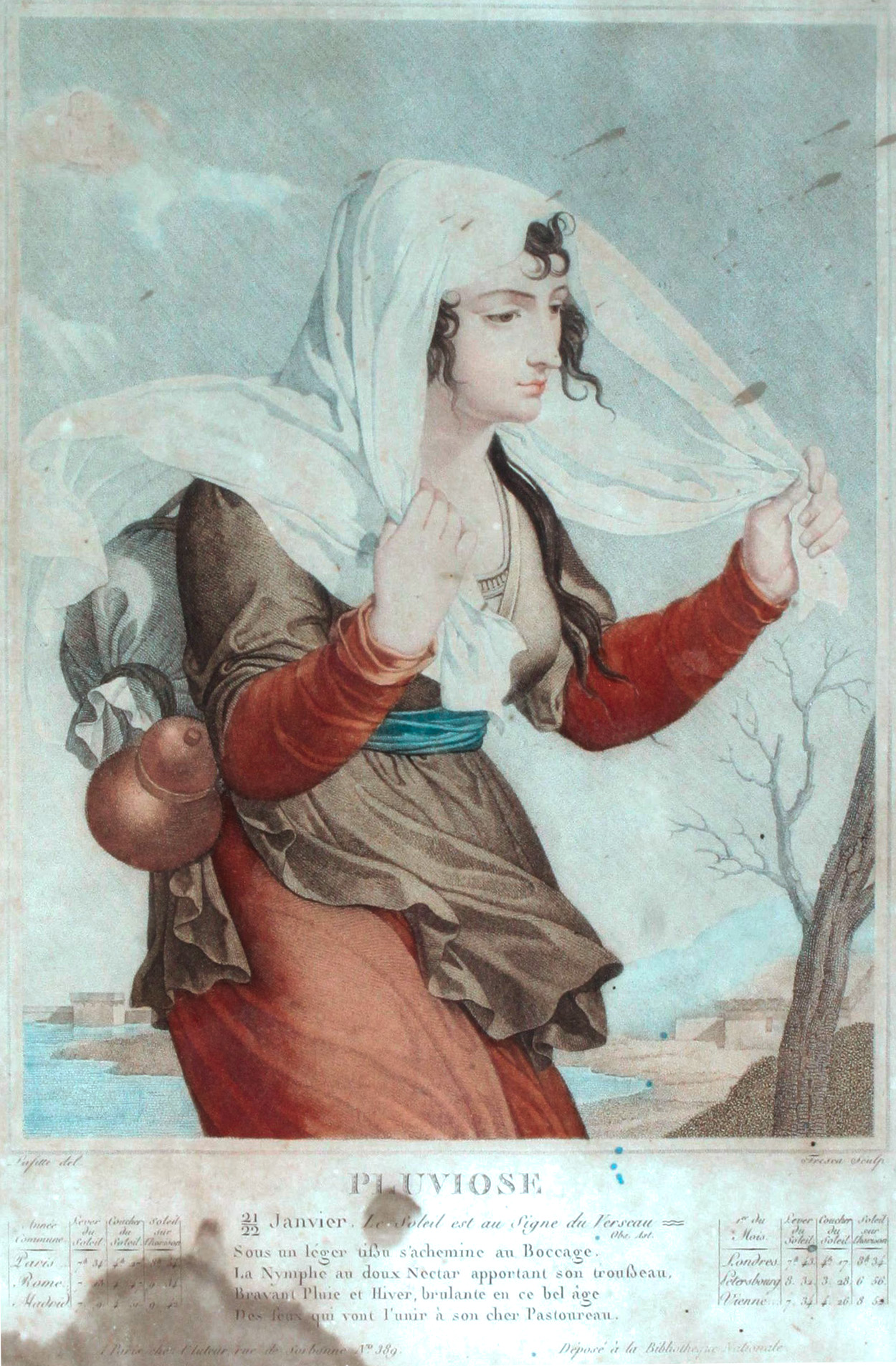
Pluviôse

23:11:35
Time of day - 24 h/day
Greenwich

Year: 7
Month: Pluviôse
Year: VII

Day of the 10-day
week (décade)
Primidi
Duodi
Tridi
Quartidi
Quintidi
Sextidi
Septidi
Octidi
Nonidi
Décadi

décade 13
1	Sunday; 20 January 1799
2	Monday; 21 January 1799
3	Tuesday; 22 January 1799
4	Wednesday; 23 January 1799
5	Thursday; 24 January 1799
6	Friday; 25 January 1799
7	Saturday; 26 January 1799
8	Sunday; 27 January 1799
9	Monday; 28 January 1799
10	Tuesday; 29 January 1799

décade 14
11	Wednesday; 30 January 1799
12	Thursday; 31 January 1799
13	Friday; 1 February 1799
14	Saturday; 2 February 1799
15	Sunday; 3 February 1799
16	Monday; 4 February 1799
17	Tuesday; 5 February 1799
18	Wednesday; 6 February 1799
19	Thursday; 7 February 1799
20	Friday; 8 February 1799

décade 15
21	Saturday; 9 February 1799
22	Sunday; 10 February 1799
23	Monday; 11 February 1799
24	Tuesday; 12 February 1799
25	Wednesday; 13 February 1799
26	Thursday; 14 February 1799
27	Friday; 15 February 1799
28	Saturday; 16 February 1799
29	Sunday; 17 February 1799
30	Monday; 18 February 1799

Decimal time – 10 h/day
Paris
9:66:37

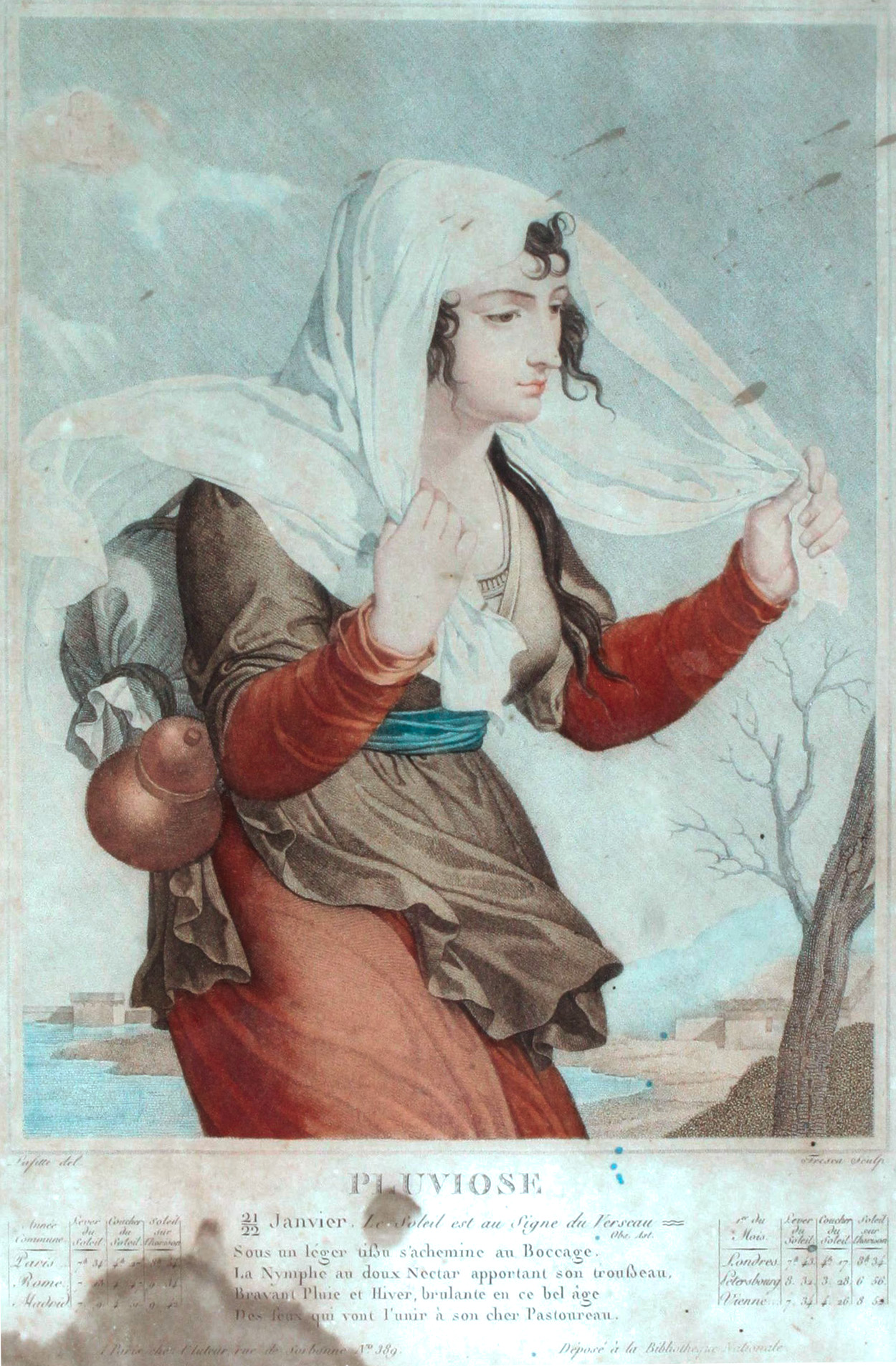
Pluviôse

23:11:35
Time of day - 24 h/day
Greenwich

Year: 8
Month: Pluviôse
Year: VIII

Day of the 10-day
week (décade)
Primidi
Duodi
Tridi
Quartidi
Quintidi
Sextidi
Septidi
Octidi
Nonidi
Décadi

décade 13
1	Tuesday; 21 January 1800
2	Wednesday; 22 January 1800
3	Thursday; 23 January 1800
4	Friday; 24 January 1800
5	Saturday; 25 January 1800
6	Sunday; 26 January 1800
7	Monday; 27 January 1800
8	Tuesday; 28 January 1800
9	Wednesday; 29 January 1800
10	Thursday; 30 January 1800

décade 14
11	Friday; 31 January 1800
12	Saturday; 1 February 1800
13	Sunday; 2 February 1800
14	Monday; 3 February 1800
15	Tuesday; 4 February 1800
16	Wednesday; 5 February 1800
17	Thursday; 6 February 1800
18	Friday; 7 February 1800
19	Saturday; 8 February 1800
20	Sunday; 9 February 1800

décade 15
21	Monday; 10 February 1800
22	Tuesday; 11 February 1800
23	Wednesday; 12 February 1800
24	Thursday; 13 February 1800
25	Friday; 14 February 1800
26	Saturday; 15 February 1800
27	Sunday; 16 February 1800
28	Monday; 17 February 1800
29	Tuesday; 18 February 1800
30	Wednesday; 19 February 1800

Decimal time – 10 h/day
Paris
9:66:37

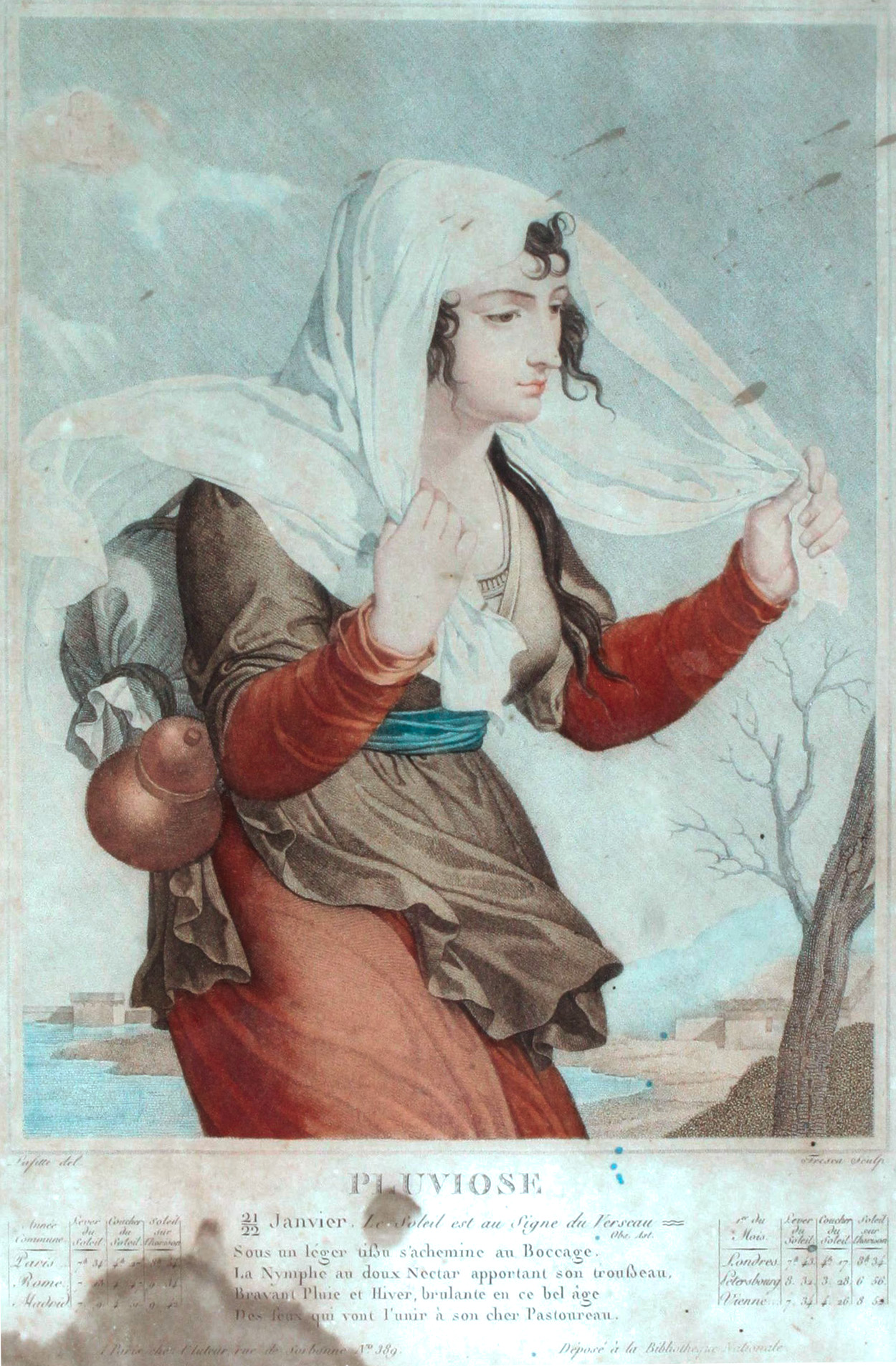
Pluviôse

23:11:35
Time of day - 24 h/day
Greenwich

Year: 9
Month: Pluviôse
Year: IX

Day of the 10-day
week (décade)
Primidi
Duodi
Tridi
Quartidi
Quintidi
Sextidi
Septidi
Octidi
Nonidi
Décadi

décade 13
1	Wednesday; 21 January 1801
2	Thursday; 22 January 1801
3	Friday; 23 January 1801
4	Saturday; 24 January 1801
5	Sunday; 25 January 1801
6	Monday; 26 January 1801
7	Tuesday; 27 January 1801
8	Wednesday; 28 January 1801
9	Thursday; 29 January 1801
10	Friday; 30 January 1801

décade 14
11	Saturday; 31 January 1801
12	Sunday; 1 February 1801
13	Monday; 2 February 1801
14	Tuesday; 3 February 1801
15	Wednesday; 4 February 1801
16	Thursday; 5 February 1801
17	Friday; 6 February 1801
18	Saturday; 7 February 1801
19	Sunday; 8 February 1801
20	Monday; 9 February 1801

décade 15
21	Tuesday; 10 February 1801
22	Wednesday; 11 February 1801
23	Thursday; 12 February 1801
24	Friday; 13 February 1801
25	Saturday; 14 February 1801
26	Sunday; 15 February 1801
27	Monday; 16 February 1801
28	Tuesday; 17 February 1801
29	Wednesday; 18 February 1801
30	Thursday; 19 February 1801

Decimal time – 10 h/day
Paris
9:66:37

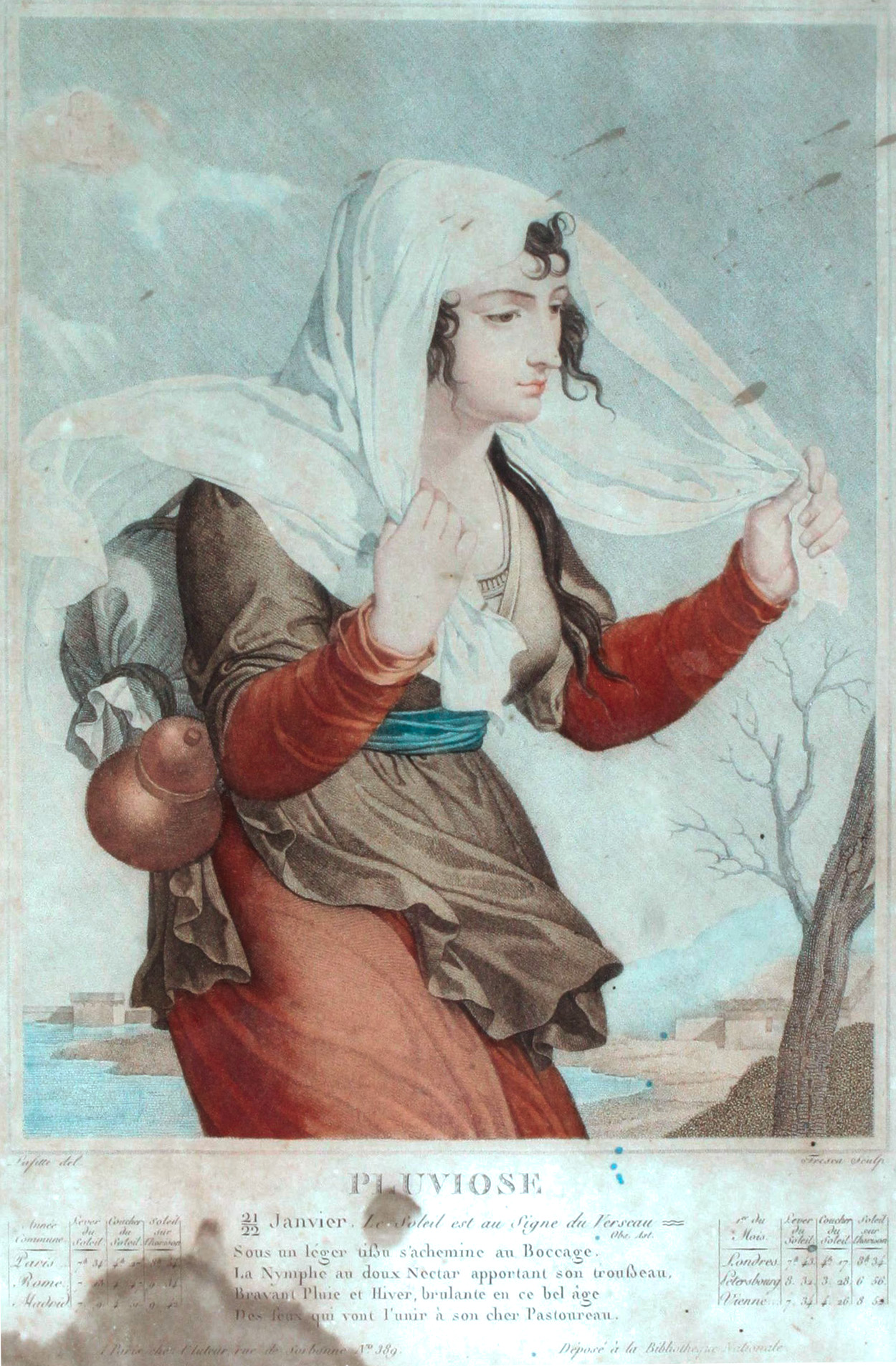
Pluviôse

23:11:35
Time of day - 24 h/day
Greenwich

Year: 10
Month: Pluviôse
Year: X

Day of the 10-day
week (décade)
Primidi
Duodi
Tridi
Quartidi
Quintidi
Sextidi
Septidi
Octidi
Nonidi
Décadi

décade 13
1	Thursday; 21 January 1802
2	Friday; 22 January 1802
3	Saturday; 23 January 1802
4	Sunday; 24 January 1802
5	Monday; 25 January 1802
6	Tuesday; 26 January 1802
7	Wednesday; 27 January 1802
8	Thursday; 28 January 1802
9	Friday; 29 January 1802
10	Saturday; 30 January 1802

décade 14
11	Sunday; 31 January 1802
12	Monday; 1 February 1802
13	Tuesday; 2 February 1802
14	Wednesday; 3 February 1802
15	Thursday; 4 February 1802
16	Friday; 5 February 1802
17	Saturday; 6 February 1802
18	Sunday; 7 February 1802
19	Monday; 8 February 1802
20	Tuesday; 9 February 1802

décade 15
21	Wednesday; 10 February 1802
22	Thursday; 11 February 1802
23	Friday; 12 February 1802
24	Saturday; 13 February 1802
25	Sunday; 14 February 1802
26	Monday; 15 February 1802
27	Tuesday; 16 February 1802
28	Wednesday; 17 February 1802
29	Thursday; 18 February 1802
30	Friday; 19 February 1802

Decimal time – 10 h/day
Paris
9:66:37

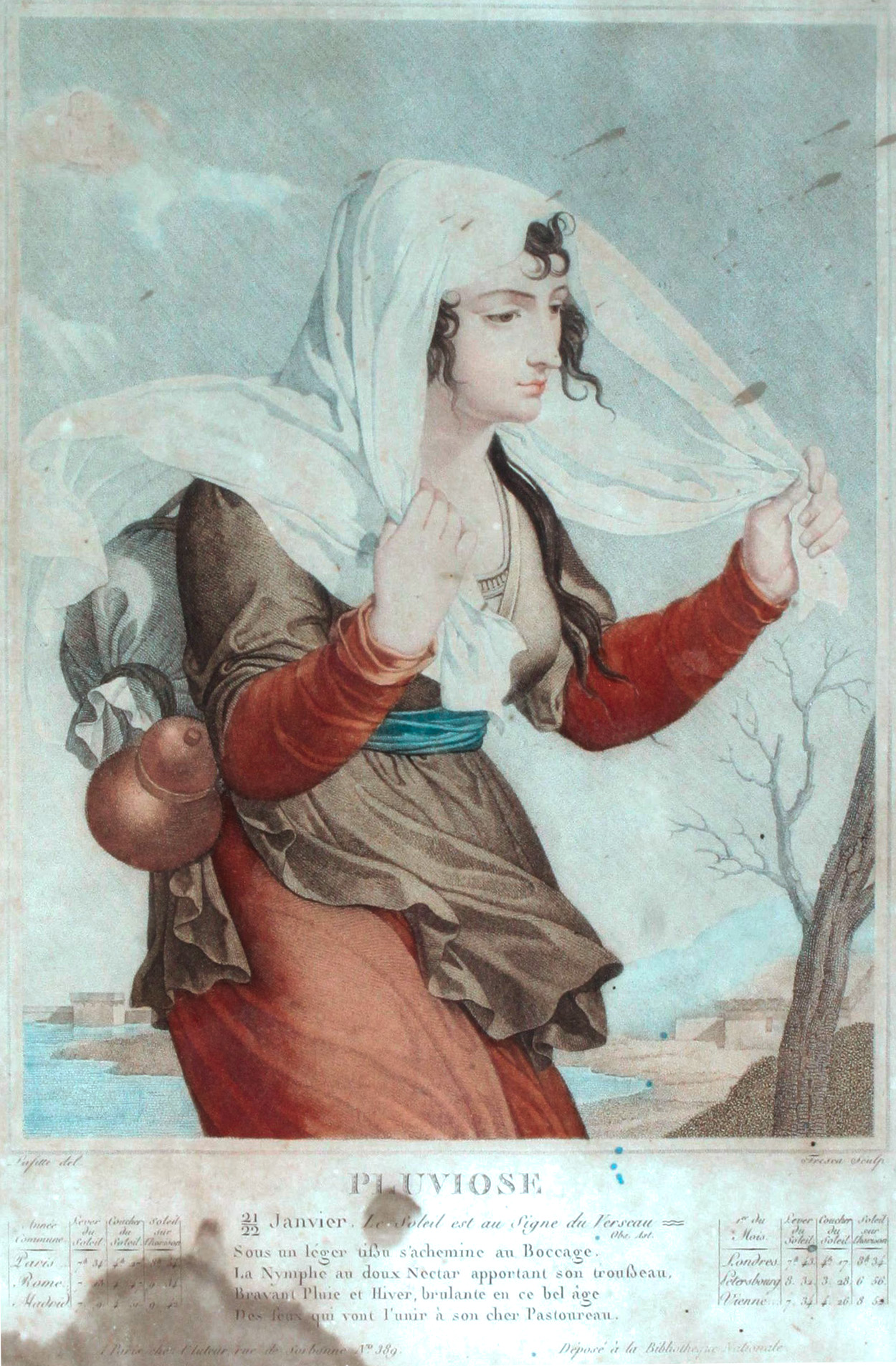
Pluviôse

23:11:35
Time of day - 24 h/day
Greenwich

Year: 11
Month: Pluviôse
Year: XI

Day of the 10-day
week (décade)
Primidi
Duodi
Tridi
Quartidi
Quintidi
Sextidi
Septidi
Octidi
Nonidi
Décadi

décade 13
1	Friday; 21 January 1803
2	Saturday; 22 January 1803
3	Sunday; 23 January 1803
4	Monday; 24 January 1803
5	Tuesday; 25 January 1803
6	Wednesday; 26 January 1803
7	Thursday; 27 January 1803
8	Friday; 28 January 1803
9	Saturday; 29 January 1803
10	Sunday; 30 January 1803

décade 14
11	Monday; 31 January 1803
12	Tuesday; 1 February 1803
13	Wednesday; 2 February 1803
14	Thursday; 3 February 1803
15	Friday; 4 February 1803
16	Saturday; 5 February 1803
17	Sunday; 6 February 1803
18	Monday; 7 February 1803
19	Tuesday; 8 February 1803
20	Wednesday; 9 February 1803

décade 15
21	Thursday; 10 February 1803
22	Friday; 11 February 1803
23	Saturday; 12 February 1803
24	Sunday; 13 February 1803
25	Monday; 14 February 1803
26	Tuesday; 15 February 1803
27	Wednesday; 16 February 1803
28	Thursday; 17 February 1803
29	Friday; 18 February 1803
30	Saturday; 19 February 1803

Decimal time – 10 h/day
Paris
9:66:37

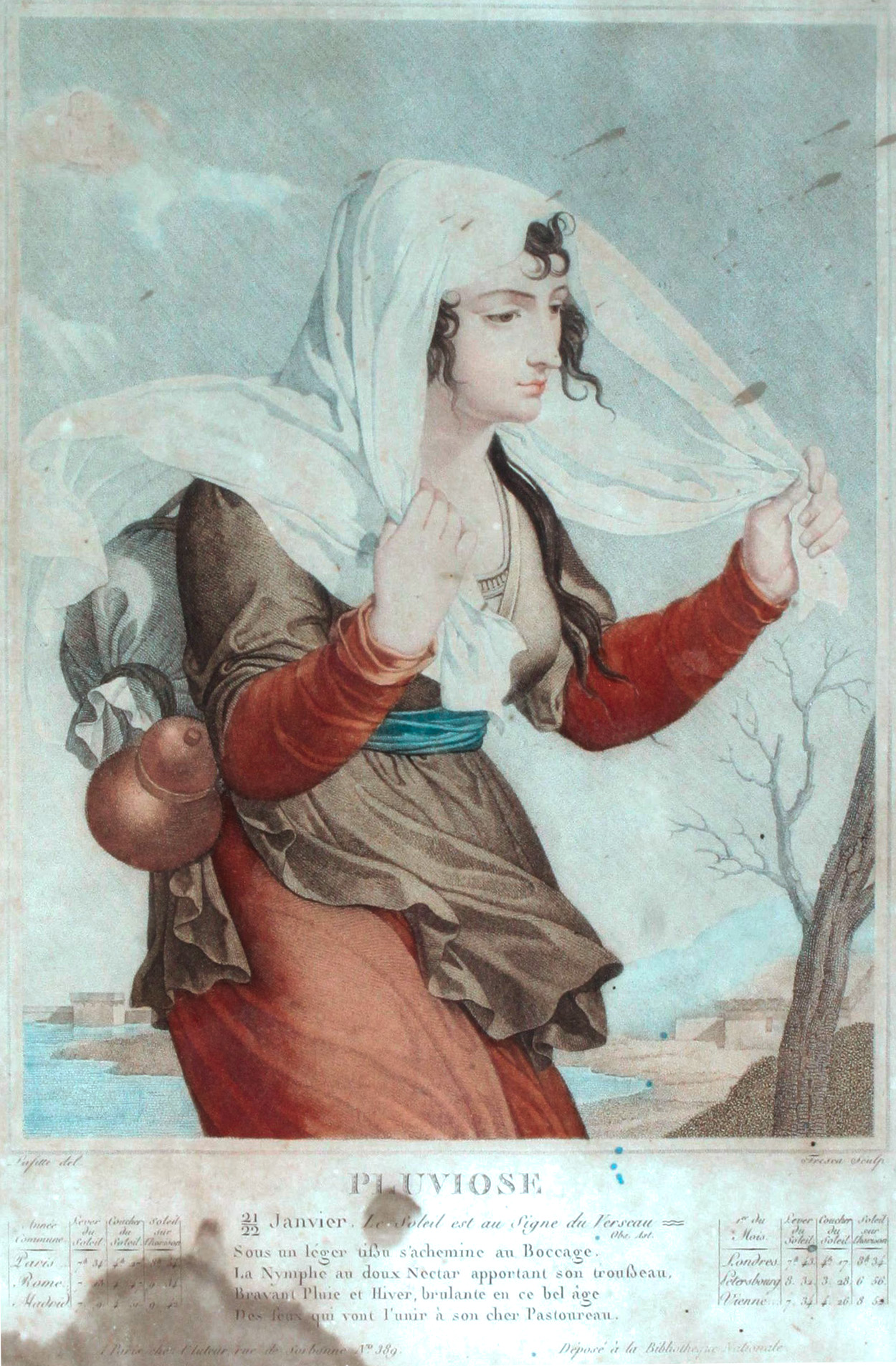
Pluviôse

23:11:35
Time of day - 24 h/day
Greenwich

Year: 12
Month: Pluviôse
Year: XII

Day of the 10-day
week (décade)
Primidi
Duodi
Tridi
Quartidi
Quintidi
Sextidi
Septidi
Octidi
Nonidi
Décadi

décade 13
1	Sunday; 22 January 1804
2	Monday; 23 January 1804
3	Tuesday; 24 January 1804
4	Wednesday; 25 January 1804
5	Thursday; 26 January 1804
6	Friday; 27 January 1804
7	Saturday; 28 January 1804
8	Sunday; 29 January 1804
9	Monday; 30 January 1804
10	Tuesday; 31 January 1804

décade 14
11	Wednesday; 1 February 1804
12	Thursday; 2 February 1804
13	Friday; 3 February 1804
14	Saturday; 4 February 1804
15	Sunday; 5 February 1804
16	Monday; 6 February 1804
17	Tuesday; 7 February 1804
18	Wednesday; 8 February 1804
19	Thursday; 9 February 1804
20	Friday; 10 February 1804

décade 15
21	Saturday; 11 February 1804
22	Sunday; 12 February 1804
23	Monday; 13 February 1804
24	Tuesday; 14 February 1804
25	Wednesday; 15 February 1804
26	Thursday; 16 February 1804
27	Friday; 17 February 1804
28	Saturday; 18 February 1804
29	Sunday; 19 February 1804
30	Monday; 20 February 1804

Decimal time – 10 h/day
Paris
9:66:37

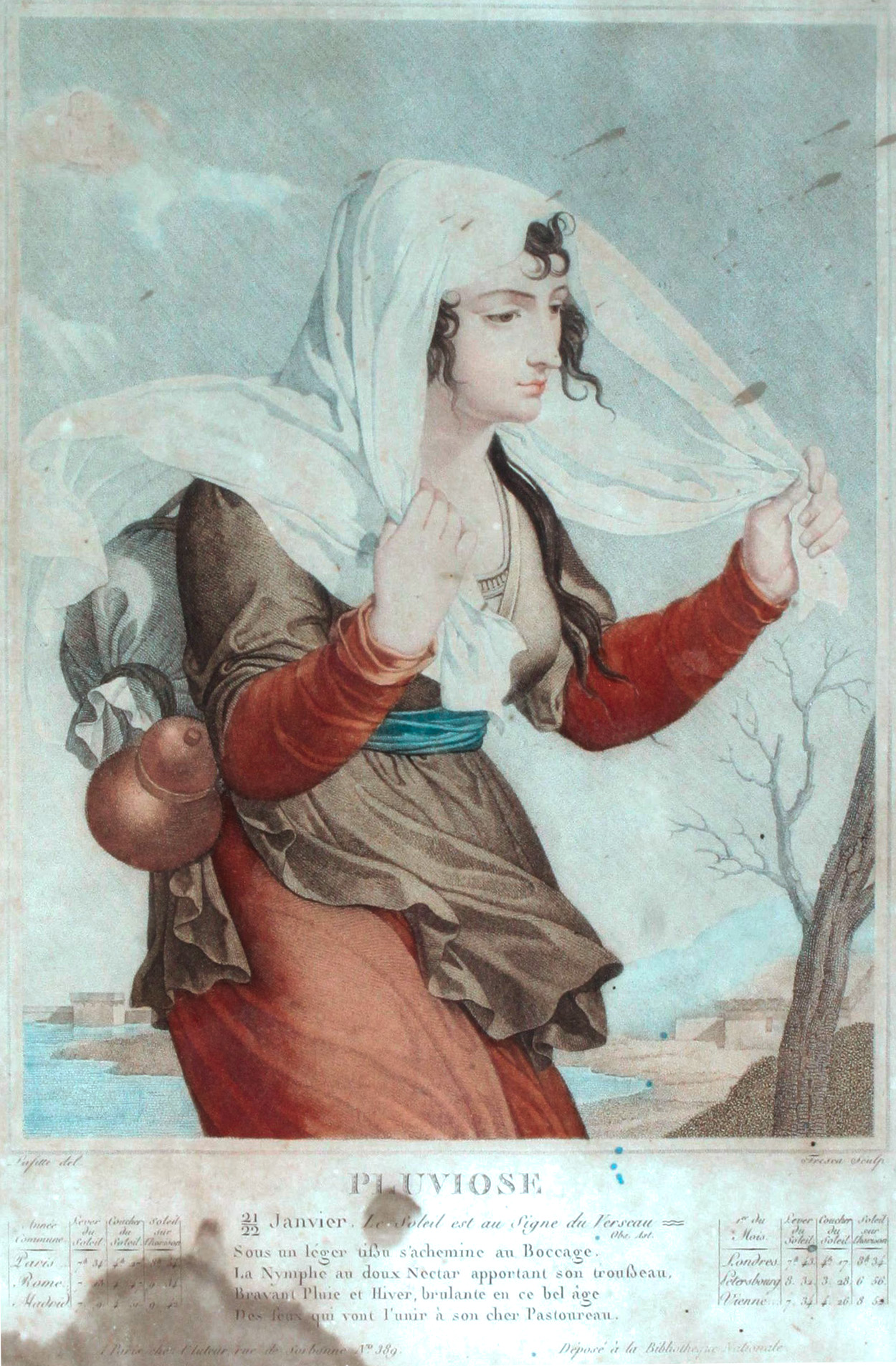
Pluviôse

23:11:35
Time of day - 24 h/day
Greenwich

Year: 13
Month: Pluviôse
Year: XIII

Day of the 10-day
week (décade)
Primidi
Duodi
Tridi
Quartidi
Quintidi
Sextidi
Septidi
Octidi
Nonidi
Décadi

décade 13
1	Monday; 21 January 1805
2	Tuesday; 22 January 1805
3	Wednesday; 23 January 1805
4	Thursday; 24 January 1805
5	Friday; 25 January 1805
6	Saturday; 26 January 1805
7	Sunday; 27 January 1805
8	Monday; 28 January 1805
9	Tuesday; 29 January 1805
10	Wednesday; 30 January 1805

décade 14
11	Thursday; 31 January 1805
12	Friday; 1 February 1805
13	Saturday; 2 February 1805
14	Sunday; 3 February 1805
15	Monday; 4 February 1805
16	Tuesday; 5 February 1805
17	Wednesday; 6 February 1805
18	Thursday; 7 February 1805
19	Friday; 8 February 1805
20	Saturday; 9 February 1805

décade 15
21	Sunday; 10 February 1805
22	Monday; 11 February 1805
23	Tuesday; 12 February 1805
24	Wednesday; 13 February 1805
25	Thursday; 14 February 1805
26	Friday; 15 February 1805
27	Saturday; 16 February 1805
28	Sunday; 17 February 1805
29	Monday; 18 February 1805
30	Tuesday; 19 February 1805

Decimal time – 10 h/day
Paris
9:66:37

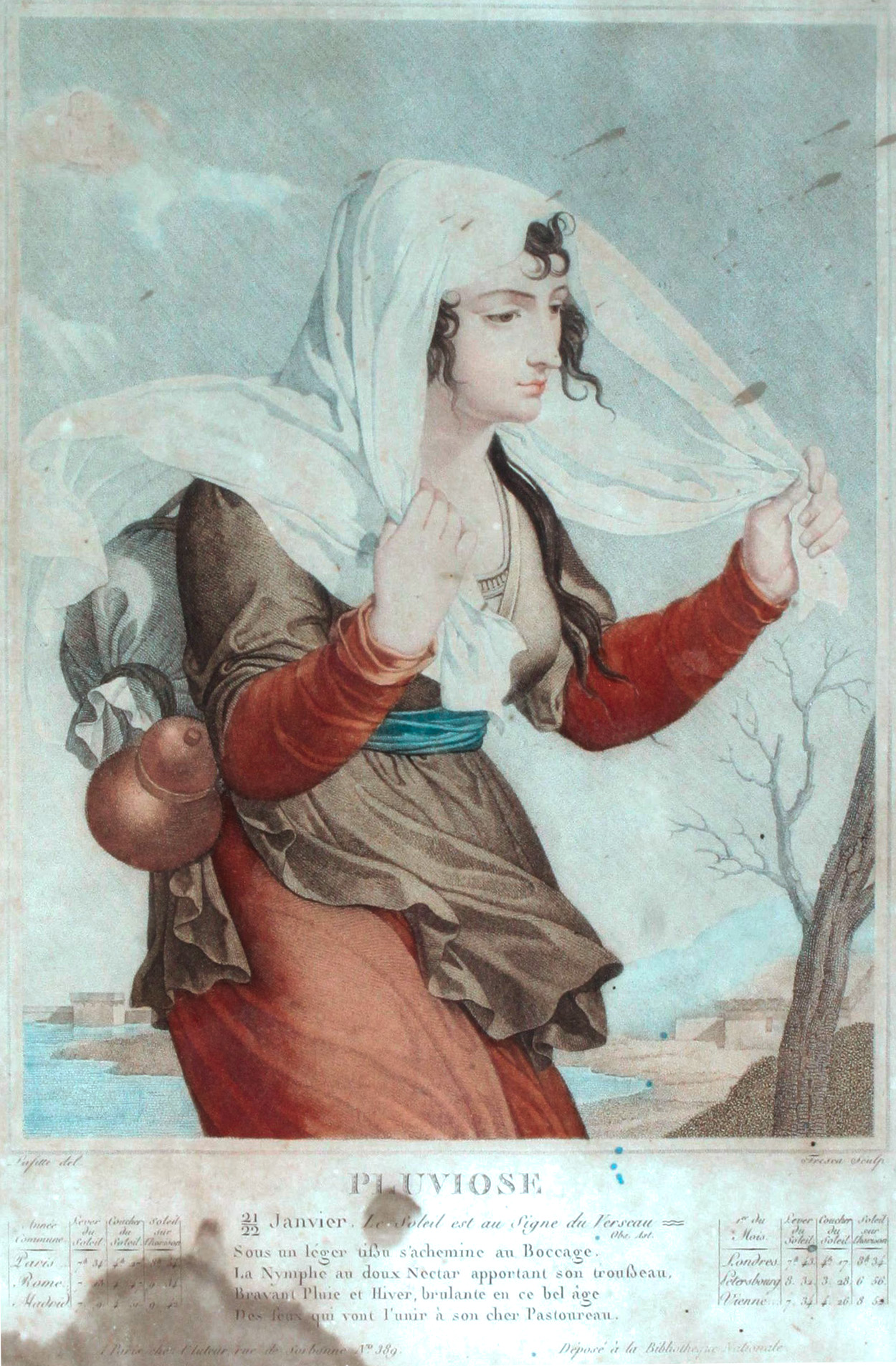
Pluviôse

23:11:35
Time of day - 24 h/day
Greenwich

Year: 14
Month: Pluviôse
Year: XIV

Day of the 10-day
week (décade)
Primidi
Duodi
Tridi
Quartidi
Quintidi
Sextidi
Septidi
Octidi
Nonidi
Décadi

décade 13
1	Tuesday; 21 January 1806
2	Wednesday; 22 January 1806
3	Thursday; 23 January 1806
4	Friday; 24 January 1806
5	Saturday; 25 January 1806
6	Sunday; 26 January 1806
7	Monday; 27 January 1806
8	Tuesday; 28 January 1806
9	Wednesday; 29 January 1806
10	Thursday; 30 January 1806

décade 14
11	Friday; 31 January 1806
12	Saturday; 1 February 1806
13	Sunday; 2 February 1806
14	Monday; 3 February 1806
15	Tuesday; 4 February 1806
16	Wednesday; 5 February 1806
17	Thursday; 6 February 1806
18	Friday; 7 February 1806
19	Saturday; 8 February 1806
20	Sunday; 9 February 1806

décade 15
21	Monday; 10 February 1806
22	Tuesday; 11 February 1806
23	Wednesday; 12 February 1806
24	Thursday; 13 February 1806
25	Friday; 14 February 1806
26	Saturday; 15 February 1806
27	Sunday; 16 February 1806
28	Monday; 17 February 1806
29	Tuesday; 18 February 1806
30	Wednesday; 19 February 1806

Decimal time – 10 h/day
Paris
9:66:37

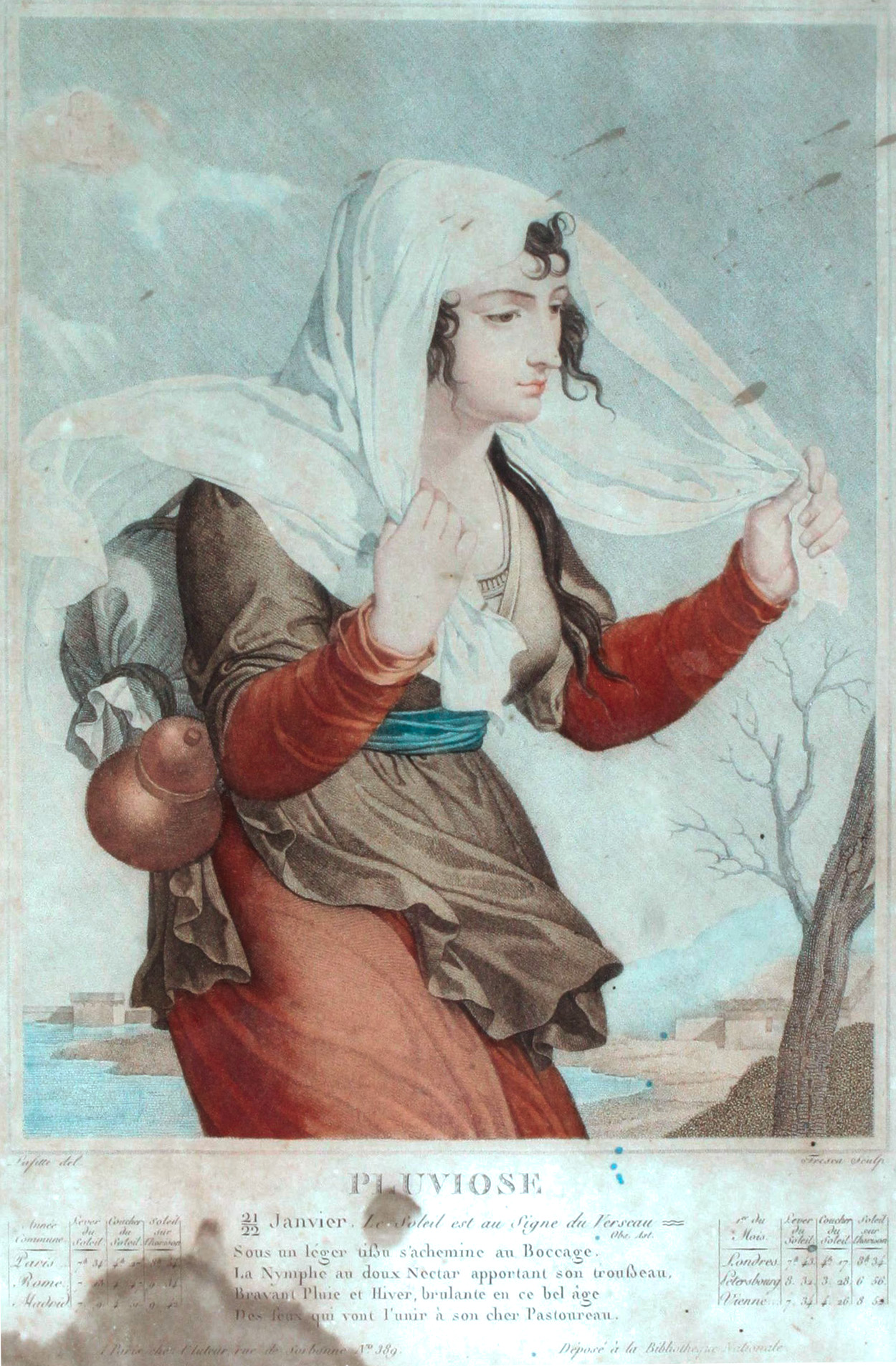
Pluviôse

23:11:35
Time of day - 24 h/day
Greenwich

== Day name table ==
Like all FRC months, Pluviôse lasted 30 days and was divided into three 10-day weeks called décades (decades). Each day had the name of an agricultural plant, except the 5th (Quintidi) and 10th day (Decadi) of every decade, which had the name of a domestic animal (Quintidi) or an agricultural tool (Decadi).

	1^{re} Décade		2^{e} Décade		3^{e} Décade
Primidi	1.	Lauréole (Spurge Laurel)	11.	Ellébore (Hellebore)	21.	Thlaspi (Pennycress)
Duodi	2.	Mousse (Moss)	12.	Broccoli (Broccoli)	22.	Thimelé (Rose Daphne)
Tridi	3.	Fragon (Butcher's Broom)	13.	Laurier (Laurel)	23.	Chiendent (Couchgrass)
Quartidi	4.	Perce Neige (Snowdrop)	14.	Avelinier (Cobnut)	24.	Traînasse (Knotweed)
Quintidi	5.	Taureau (Bull)	15.	Vache (Cow)	25.	Lièvre (Hare)
Sextidi	6.	Laurier Thym (Bay Thyme)	16.	Buis (Boxwood)	26.	Guèdre (Dyer's Woad)
Septidi	7.	Amadouvier (Tinder Fungus)	17.	Lichen (Iceland Moss)	27.	Noisetier (Hazelnut)
Octidi	8.	Mézéréon (February Daphne)	18.	If (Yew)	28.	Cyclamen (Sowbread)
Nonidi	9.	Peuplier (Poplar)	19.	Pulmonaire (Lungwort)	29.	Chélidoine (Celandine)
Decadi	10.	Coignée (Hatchet)	20.	Serpette (Pruning Knife)	30.	Traineau (Sleigh)

== Conversion table ==
Table for conversion between Republican and Gregorian Calendar
for the month "Pluviôse"

I. / II. / III. / V. / VI. / VII.
1	2	3	4	5	6	7	8	9	10	11	12	13	14	15	16	17	18	19	20	21	22	23	24	25	26	27	28	29	30
20	21	22	23	24	25	26	27	28	29	30	31	1	2	3	4	5	6	7	8	9	10	11	12	13	14	15	16	17	18
January / 1793 / 1794 / 1795 / 1797 / 1798 / 1799 / February

IV. / VIII. / IX. / X. / XI. / XIII.
1	2	3	4	5	6	7	8	9	10	11	12	13	14	15	16	17	18	19	20	21	22	23	24	25	26	27	28	29	30
21	22	23	24	25	26	27	28	29	30	31	1	2	3	4	5	6	7	8	9	10	11	12	13	14	15	16	17	18	19
January / 1796 / 1800 / 1801 / 1802 / 1803 / 1805 / February

XII.
1	2	3	4	5	6	7	8	9	10	11	12	13	14	15	16	17	18	19	20	21	22	23	24	25	26	27	28	29	30
22	23	24	25	26	27	28	29	30	31	1	2	3	4	5	6	7	8	9	10	11	12	13	14	15	16	17	18	19	20
January / 1804 / February
