= Ministry of Police (France) =

French law enforcement agency

- Ministère de la police

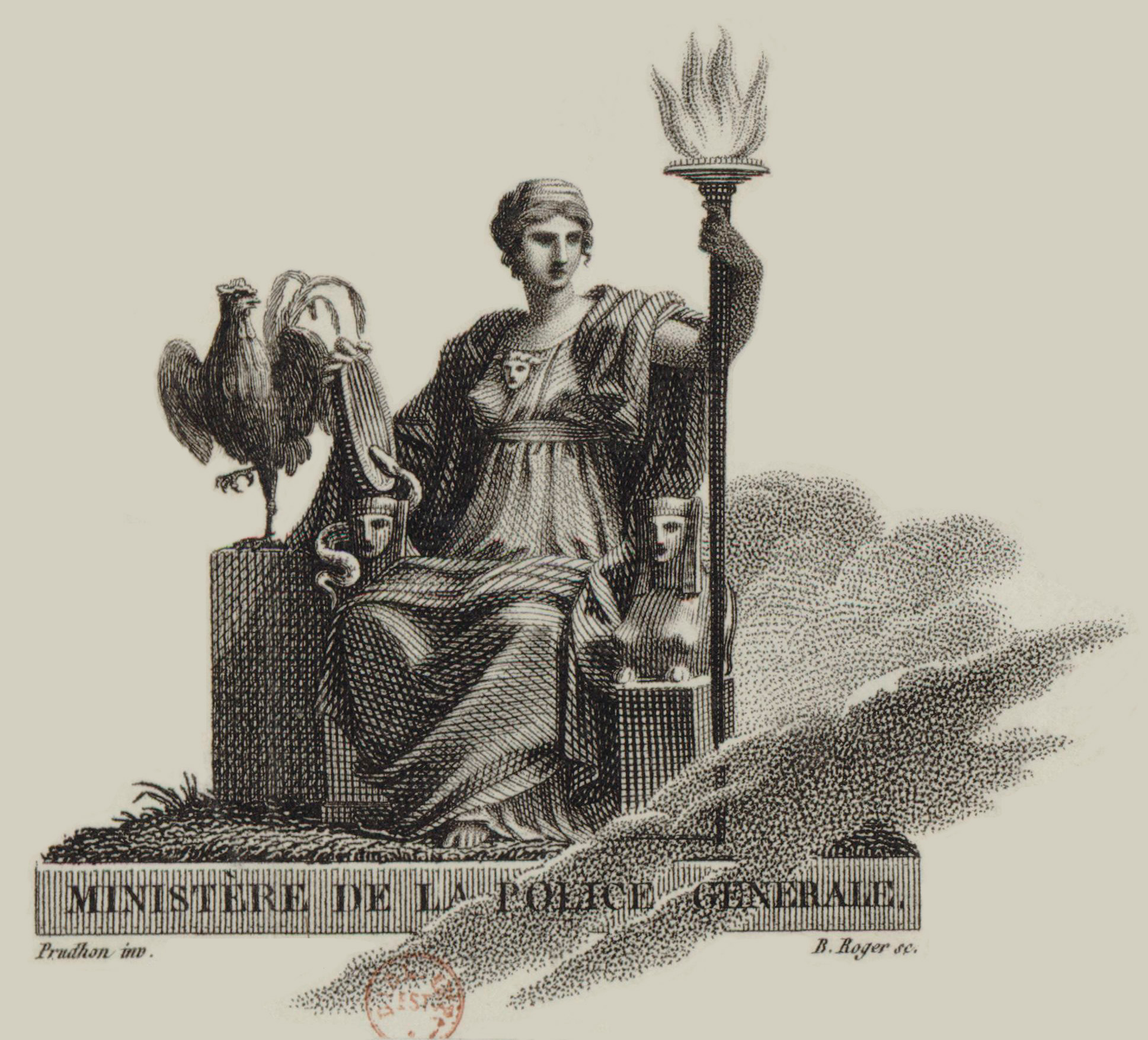
- Emblem of the ministry.

Ministry overview
- Formed: 2 January 1796
- Dissolved: 21 June 1853
- Superseding Ministry: Ministry of Interior
- Headquarters: Hôtel de Juigné
- Minister responsible: Minister of Police

The Ministry of Police (French: Ministère de la police) was the Government of France department responsible for the police from its creation in 1796 to its suppression in 1818, and briefly again between 1852 and 1853. It was headed by the Minister of Police.

== History ==
On 2 January 1796 and only two months after its establishment, the Executive Directory created a seventh ministry under the name of Ministry of General Police. The decree of creation mentions in its introduction a resolution of the Council of Five Hundred recognizing that the Ministry of Interior was unable to properly lead the police of the republic due to its size, and as such it declared a state of emergency.

During its existence and after years of troubles, the ministry was able to create a database of known criminals and offenders which reportedly helped to stabilize the regime.

Its administration was merged with the interior portfolio in 1818 by King Louis XVIII. In 1852, President Louis-Napoléon Bonaparte recreated the ministry for his friend Charlemagne de Maupas, but it was definitely abolished a year and a half later.

== Organization ==
The headquarters of the department were located at the Hôtel de Juigné, Quai Malaquais.
