= Tribunat =

Legislative body in Napoleonic France

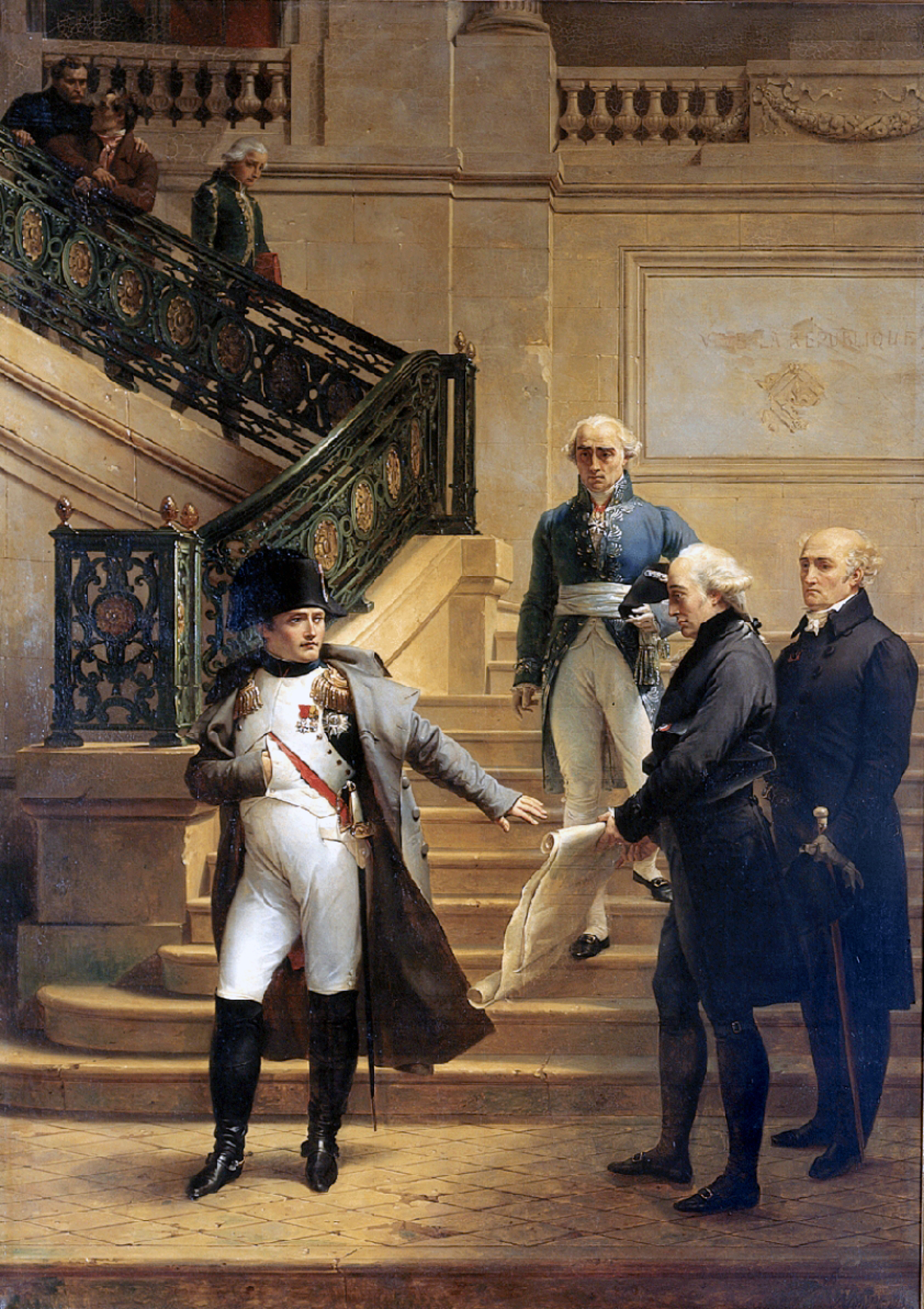
Napoleon’s visit to the Palais-Royal on 19 August 1807; the Palais-Royal was the seat of the Tribunat, a consultative assembly that was abolished in 1807. The man in the blue coat is Jean-Claude Fabre, known as Fabre de l’Aude, the president of the Tribunat. Napoleon, angered by his presence, leaves the palace while rejecting the redevelopment plans proposed by the two. (Painting by Merry-Joseph Blondel, 1934)

The Tribunat was one of the four assemblies set up in France by the Constitution of Year VIII (the other three were the Council of State, the Corps législatif and the Sénat conservateur). It was set up officially on 1 January 1800 at the same time as the Corps législatif. Its first president was the historian Pierre Daunou, whose independent spirit led to his dismissal from the post by Napoleon Bonaparte in 1802. The Tribunat assumed some of the functions of the Council of Five Hundred, but its role consisted only of deliberating projected laws before their adoption by the Corps législatif, with the legislative initiative remaining with the Council of State.

== Elections ==
As with elections to the Corps législatif, members of the Tribunat were not elected by direct universal suffrage. They were chosen via a complex process by the Senate from the "national lists of notables" (listes nationales de notabilités) set up following a series of votes "en cascade" - the citizens would first elect "communal notables" from one tenth of their number, who would choose "departmental notables" from one tenth of their number, who would in turn choose "national notables" from another one tenth of their number.

== Functions ==
The Tribunat's function was to send three orators to discuss proposed laws with government orators in the presence of the Corps législatif. It could not vote on such laws, but its decisions did have some consequence, if only as a consultative opinion, with the final decision always coming back as a last resort to the First Consul, who might or might not take the Tribunat's opinion into account. The Tribunat could also ask the Senate to overturn "the lists of eligibles, the acts of the Legislative Body and those of the government" on account of unconstitutionality, but the Tribunat's opinion was, once again, non-binding.

== History ==
Shortly after the coup d'état of 18 Brumaire, the Tribunat became a focus of opposition to the regime the First Consul was in the process of setting up. Also, on 7 January, Benjamin Constant entered the Tribunat and, in a speech that made him leader of the opposition, denounced "the regime of servitude and silence" Bonaparte was preparing. The Tribunat was made up of liberal personalities like Constant, whose independent point of view Bonaparte saw as prejudicial to the public order and political unity he was trying to establish. Thus it was first purged after its opposition to the projected Code civil in 1802 (a purge made possible by a manoeuvre - the Tribunat was partially renewed at the regular interval, but it was unknown who in the Tribunat would be the first to be removed, and therefore Napoleon chose his opponents), then suppressed by a decree of the Senate in 1807, with its remaining functions and members absorbed into the Corps législatif.

It is notable that the Corps législatif tended to reinforce the powers of the executive. The introduction of the plebiscite, reducing the chambers' legitimacy and thus their power, had the same aim. The Tribunat was an organ intended to improve separation of powers, but the way that the separation of powers was structured did not let the Tribunat run effectively.

== Organisation and constitution ==
The Constitution of Year VIII organised the Tribunat:

Article 27. The Tribunat is to be made up of 100 members aged at least 25; they are to be renewed every fifth year, and may be re-elected indefinitely if they are still on the national list.

The Constitution of 16 thermidor year X (4 August 1802) foresaw:

Starting in year XIII, the Tribunat will be reduced to 50 members. - Half of the 50 will leave every third year. Until this reduction, the departing members will not be replaced. - The Tribunat will be divided into sections.

The Constitution of the Year XII stated that:

The functions of the members of the Tribunate continue ten years.

The Tribunate is renewed by half every five years. The first renewal shall take place for the session of the Year XVII, in conformity with the organic senatus-consultum of 16 Thermidor, Year X.

The president of the Tribunate is appointed by the Emperor out of a presentation of three candidates made by the Tribunate by secret ballot and a majority.

The functions of the president of the Tribunate continue two years.

The Tribunate has two questors. They are appointed by the Emperor out of a triple list of candidates chosen by the Tribunate by secret ballot and a majority. Their functions are the same as those assigned to the questors of the Legislative Body by articles 19, 20, 21, 22, 23, 24 and 25 of the organic senatus-consultum of 24 Frimaire, Year XII. One of the questors is renewed each year.

The Tribunate is divided into three sections, to wit:

Section of legislation.

Section of the interior.

Section of the finances.

Each section forms a list of three of its members from whom the president of the Tribunate designates the president of the section.

The functions of the president of a section continue one year.

== Sessions ==
- 1st session: from 1 January 1800 (11 nivôse year VIII) to 7 November 1800 (16 brumaire year IX).
- 2nd session: from 22 November 1800 (1 frimaire year IX) to 7 November 1801 (16 brumaire year X).
- 3rd session: from 22 November 1801 (1 frimaire year X) to 14 August 1802 (26 thermidor year X).
- 4th session: from 20 August 1802 (2 fructidor year X) to 20 August 1803 (2 fructidor year XI).
- 5th session: from 26 September 1803 (3 vendémiaire year XII) to 2 June 1804 (13 prairial year XII).
- 6th session: from 2 December 1804 (11 frimaire year XIII) to 30 December 1805 (9 nivôse year XIV).
- 7th session: from 1 January 1806 to 12 May 1806.
- 8th session: from 14 August 1807 to 18 September 1807.
