= French Consulate =

Government of France from 1799 to 1804

French Consulate Consulat français
- Executive government of the French First Republic
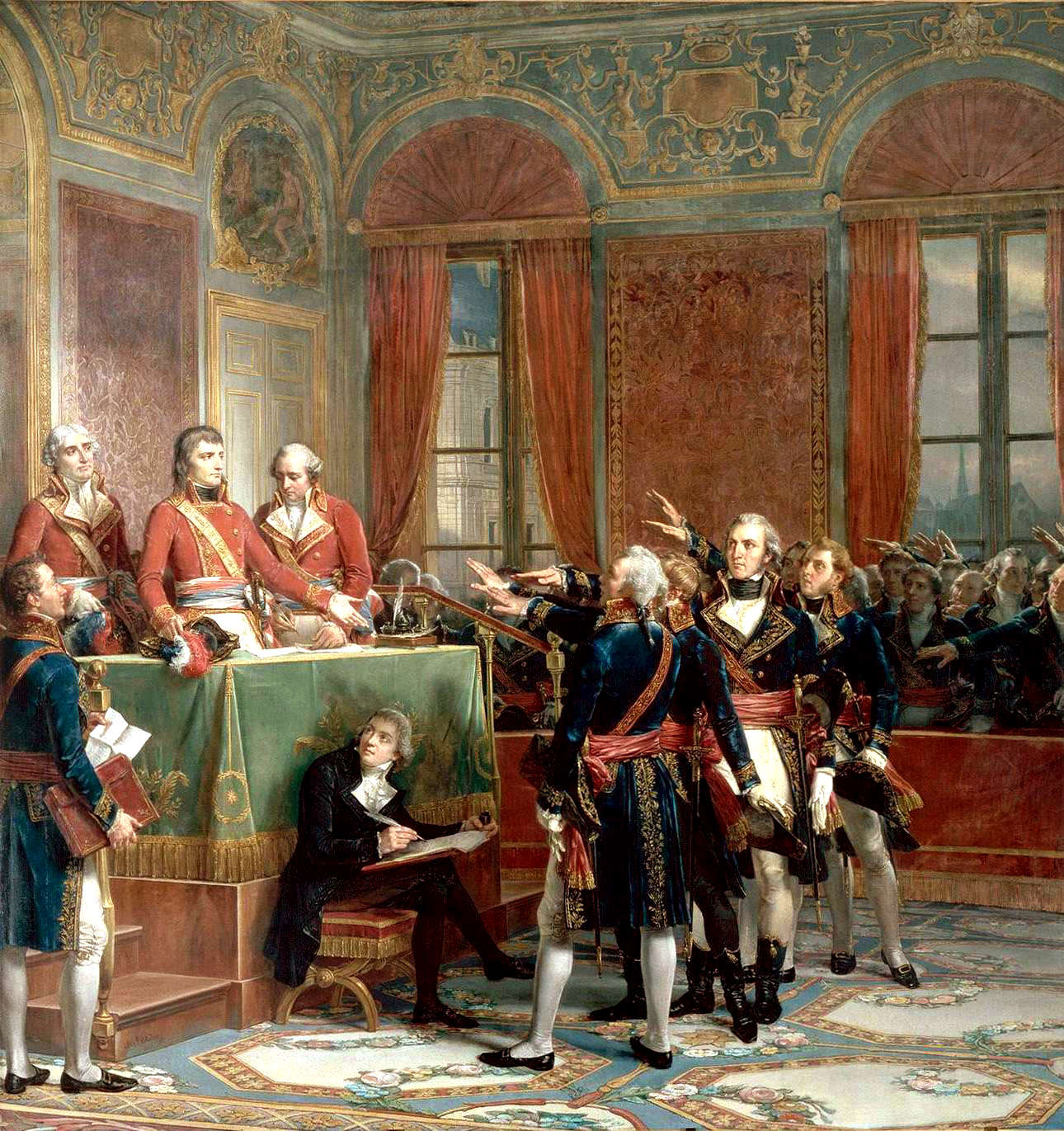
- 1856 painting of Second Consul Jean-Jacques-Régis de Cambacérès, First Consul Napoleon Bonaparte and Third Consul Charles-François Lebrun (left to right)

History
- Established: 9 November 1799
- Disbanded: 18 May 1804
- Preceded by: French Directory
- Succeeded by: First French Empire

The Consulate (French: Consulat) was the top-level government of the French First Republic from the fall of the Directory in the coup of 18 Brumaire on 9 November 1799 until the start of the First French Empire on 18 May 1804. During this period, Napoleon Bonaparte, with his appointment as First Consul, established himself as the head of an authoritarian and centralized republican government in France while not yet declaring himself sole ruler.

As Napoleon increased his power, he borrowed some of the institutions of the ancien régime in his new form of one-man government, but also made some of his own. Like the old monarchy, he re-introduced plenipotentiaries; over-centralized, and used strictly utilitarian administrative and bureaucratic methods. He constructed or consolidated the funds necessary for national institutions, local governments, universities, a judiciary system, organs of finance, banking, codes, and traditions of conscientious of a well-disciplined labour force.

However, Napoleon also instituted the Concordat of 1801, drawn up not in the Catholic Church's interest but his own. By giving satisfaction to the religious feeling of the country, it allowed him to put down the constitutional democratic Church, rally round him the support of the peasants, and above all to deprive the royalists of their best weapon. Due to the long-lasting institutions established during these years, the historian Robert B. Holtman has called the consulate "one of the most important periods of all French history." By the end of this period, Napoleon had engineered an authoritarian personal rule now viewed as a military dictatorship.

== Fall of the Directory ==
French military disasters in 1798 and 1799 had shaken the Directory, and eventually shattered it in November 1799. Historians sometimes date the start of the political downfall of the Directory to 18 June 1799 (Coup of 30 Prairial VII by the French Republican calendar). This was when anti-Jacobin Director Emmanuel Joseph Sieyès, after only a month in office, with the help of the Directory's only surviving original member, Paul Barras, also an anti-Jacobin, successfully rid himself of the other three then-sitting directors. The elections held for the two councils in March and April had produced a new "Neo-Jacobin" majority in the two bodies, and being unhappy with the existing five man Directory, by 5 June 1799, these councils had found an irregularity in the election of the Director Jean Baptiste Treilhard, who thus retired in favour of Louis-Jérôme Gohier, a Jacobin more "in tune" with the feelings in the two councils. The next day, 18 June 1799, anti-Jacobins Philippe-Antoine Merlin de Douai and Louis Marie de La Révellière-Lépeaux were also driven to resign, although one long time anti-Jacobin, popularly known for his cunning, survived the day's coup; they were replaced by the Jacobin baron Jean-François-Auguste Moulin and by non-Jacobin, or "weak" Jacobin, Roger Ducos. The three new directors were generally seen by the anti-Jacobin elite of France as non-entities, but that same elite could take some comfort in knowing that the five man Directory was still in anti-Jacobin hands, but with a reduced majority.

Additional military disasters, royalist insurrections in the south, Chouan disturbances in a dozen departments of the western part of France (mainly in Brittany, Maine, and eventually Normandy), royalist intrigues, and the end became certain. In order to soothe the populace and protect the frontier, more than the French Revolution's usual terrorist measures (such as the Law of Hostages) was necessary. The new Directory government, led by Sieyès, decided that the necessary revision of the constitution would require "a head" (his own) and "a sword" (a general to back him). With General Jean Victor Marie Moreau being unattainable as his sword, Sieyès favoured General Barthélemy Catherine Joubert; but, when Joubert was killed at the Battle of Novi on 15 August, he turned to General Napoleon Bonaparte.

Although Generals Guillaume Brune and André Masséna won battles at Bergen and Zurich, and the Allies of the Second Coalition lingered on the frontier as they had done after the Battle of Valmy, the fortunes of the Directory were still not restored. Success was reserved for Bonaparte, suddenly landing at Fréjus with the prestige of his victories in the East, and now, after General Lazare Hoche's death (1797), appearing as sole master of the armies.

On 9 November 1799 (18 Brumaire VIII), Bonaparte led the coup of 18 Brumaire, seizing French parliamentary and military power and forcing the sitting directors of the government to resign. On the night of 10 November, a remnant of the Council of Ancients abolished the Constitution of the Year III, ordained the consulate, and legalised the coup in favour of Bonaparte with the Constitution of the Year VIII.

== The new government ==
Initially, the 18 Brumaire coup seemed to be a victory for Sieyès, rather than for Bonaparte. Sieyès was a proponent of a new system of government for the Republic, and the coup initially seemed certain to bring his system into force. Bonaparte's cleverness lay in counterpoising Pierre Claude François Daunou's plan to that of Sieyès, and in retaining only those portions of each which could serve his ambition.

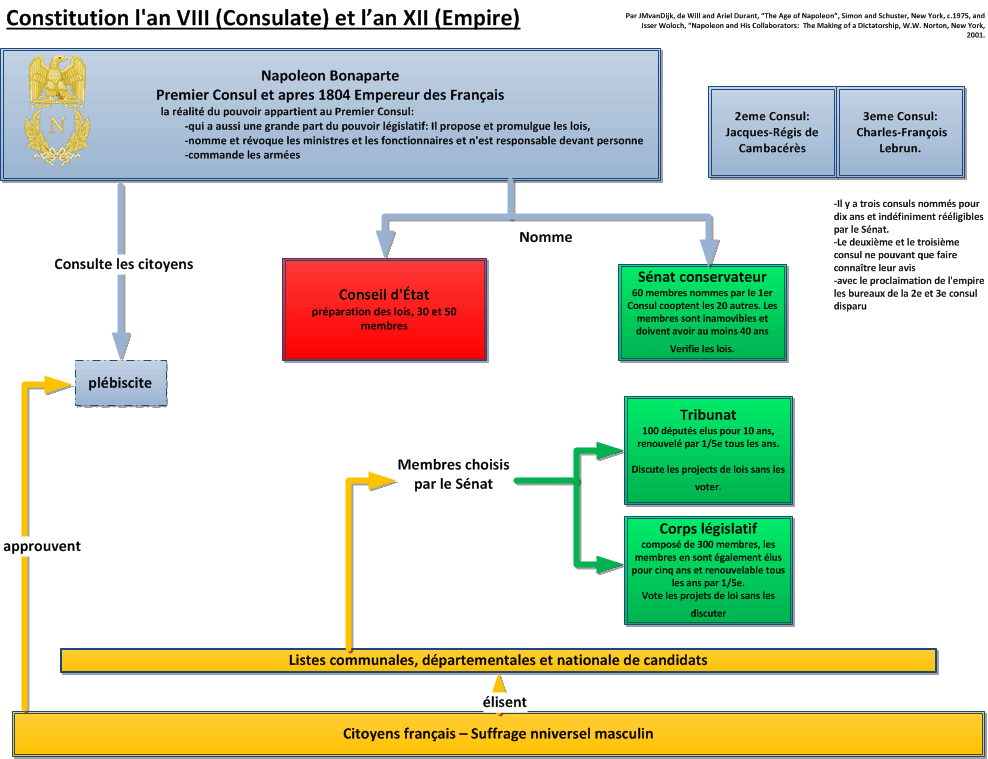
Constitution of the year VIII and later the French Empire

The new government was composed of three parliamentary assemblies: the Council of State which drafted bills, the Tribunate which could not vote on the bills but instead debated them, and the Corps législatif, whose members could not discuss the bills but voted on them after reviewing the Tribunate's debate record. The Sénat conservateur was a governmental body equal to the three aforementioned legislative assemblies and verified the draft bills and directly advised the First Consul on the implications of such bills. Ultimate executive authority was vested in three consuls, who were elected for ten years. Popular suffrage was retained, though mutilated by the lists of notables (on which the members of the Assemblies were to be chosen by the Senate). The four aforementioned governmental organs were retained under the Constitution of the Year XII, which recognised Bonaparte as the French sovereign, but their respective powers were greatly diminished.

Bonaparte vetoed Sieyès's original idea of having a single Grand Elector as supreme executive and head of state. Sieyès had intended to reserve this important position for himself, and by denying him the job Bonaparte helped reinforce the authority of the consuls, an office which he would assume. Nor was Bonaparte content simply to be part of an equal triumvirate. As the years progressed he would move to consolidate his own power as First Consul, and leave the two other consuls, Jean-Jacques-Régis de Cambacérès and Charles-François Lebrun, as well as the Assemblies, weak and subservient. By consolidating power, Bonaparte was able to transform the aristocratic constitution of Sieyès into an unavowed dictatorship.

On 7 February 1800, a public referendum confirmed the new constitution. It vested all of the real power in the hands of the First Consul, leaving only a nominal role for the other two consuls. A full 99.9% of voters approved the motion, according to the released results.

While this near-unanimity is certainly open to question, Bonaparte was genuinely popular among many voters, and after a period of strife, many in France were reassured by his dazzling but unsuccessful offers of peace to the victorious Second Coalition, his rapid disarmament of the Vendée, and his talk of stability of government, order, justice, and moderation. He gave everyone a feeling that France was governed once more by a real statesman, and that a competent government was finally in charge.

== Bonaparte's consolidation of power ==
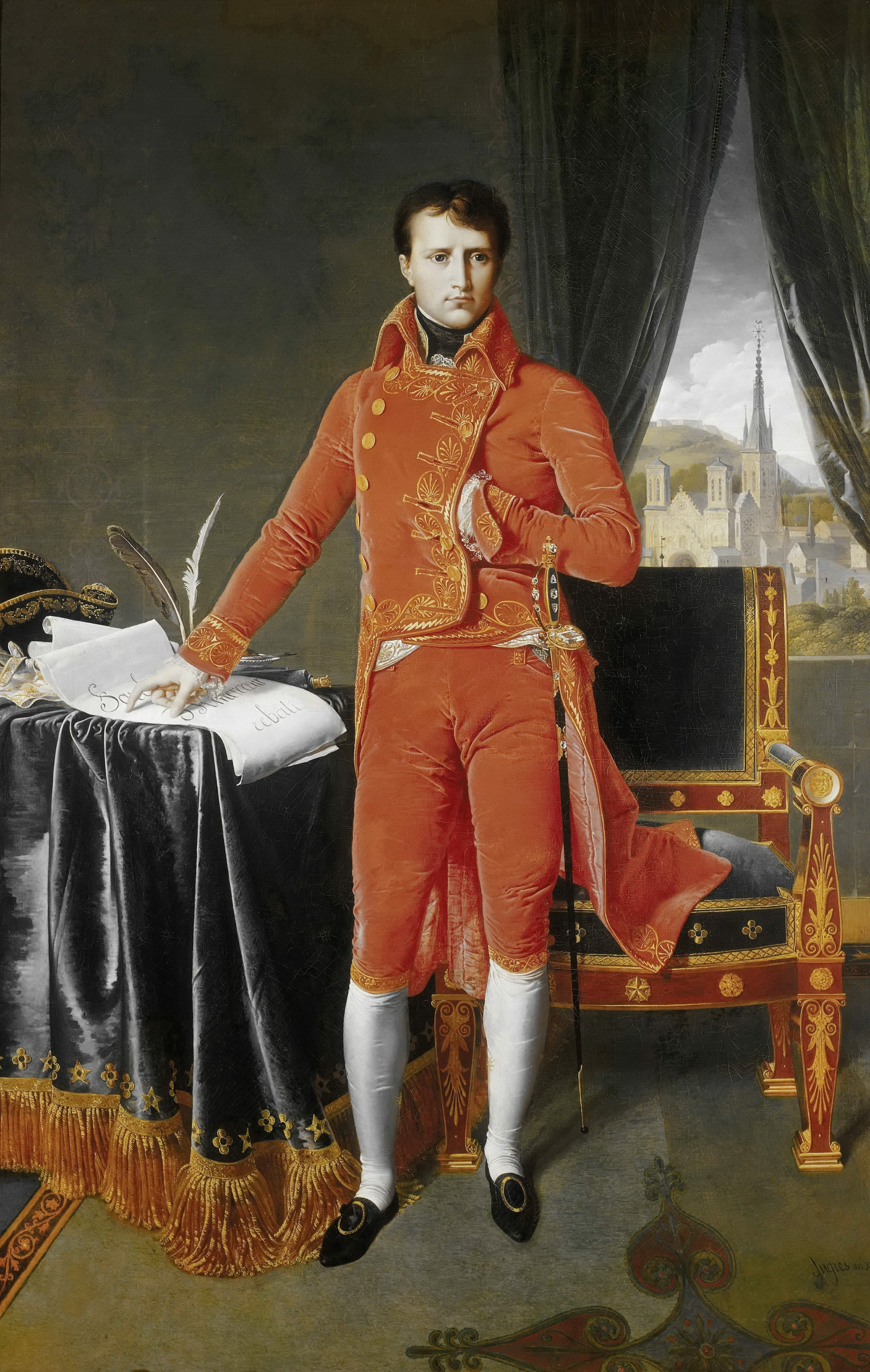
Portrait of First Consul Napoleon Bonaparte, by Jean-Auguste-Dominique Ingres

Bonaparte needed to rid himself of Sieyès and of those republicans who had no desire to hand over the republic to one man, particularly Moreau and Masséna, his military rivals. At the Battle of Marengo on 14 June 1800, what briefly seemed like a potential defeat for France was ultimately secured by the generals Louis Desaix and François Christophe de Kellermann. This offered a further opportunity to Napoleon's ambitions by increasing his popularity. The royalist plot of the rue Saint-Nicaise on 24 December allowed Napoleon to make a clean sweep of the democratic republicans, who despite their innocence, were deported to French Guiana. Napoleon annulled the Assemblies and made the Senate omnipotent in constitutional matters.

=== Foreign affairs ===
The Treaty of Lunéville with Austria, which restored peace to Europe, was signed in February 1801. Austria, which had been disarmed by Moreau's victory at the Battle of Hohenlinden, gave nearly the whole of Italy to France, and permitted Bonaparte to eliminate from the Assemblies all the leaders of the opposition in the discussion of the Civil Code. The Organic Articles hid from the eyes of his companions-in-arms and councillors a reaction which, in fact if not in law, restored to a submissive Church, despoiled of her revenues, her position as the religion of the state.

The March 1802 Peace of Amiens with the United Kingdom, of which France's allies, Spain and the Batavian Republic, paid all the costs, gave Napoleon a pretext for endowing himself with a consulate, not for ten years but for life, as a recompense from the nation. Bonaparte's path to emperor began with the Constitution of the Year X dated 4 August 1802 (16 Thermidor).

On 2 August 1802 (14 Thermidor, X), a second national referendum was held, this time to confirm Bonaparte as "First Consul for Life". Once again, a vote claimed 99.7% approval.

=== Conditions in France ===
France enjoyed a high level of peace and order under Bonaparte that helped to raise the standard of comfort. Prior to this, Paris had often suffered from hunger and thirst, and lacked fire and light, but under Bonaparte, provisions became cheap and abundant, while trade prospered and wages ran high.

In strengthening the machinery of the state, Bonaparte created the Légion d'honneur (Legion of Honour), the Concordat, and restored indirect taxes, an act seen as a betrayal of the Revolution.

Bonaparte was largely able to quell dissent within government by expelling his more vocal critics, such as Benjamin Constant and Madame de Staël. The Saint-Domingue expedition reduced the republican army to a nullity. Constant war helped demoralise and scatter the military's leaders, who were jealous of their "comrade" Bonaparte. The last major challenge to Bonaparte's authority came from Moreau, who was compromised in a royalist plot; he too was sent into exile.

In contradistinction to the opposition of senators and republican generals, the majority of the French populace remained uncritical of Bonaparte's authority. No suggestion of the possibility of his death was tolerated.

== Duke of Enghien affair ==
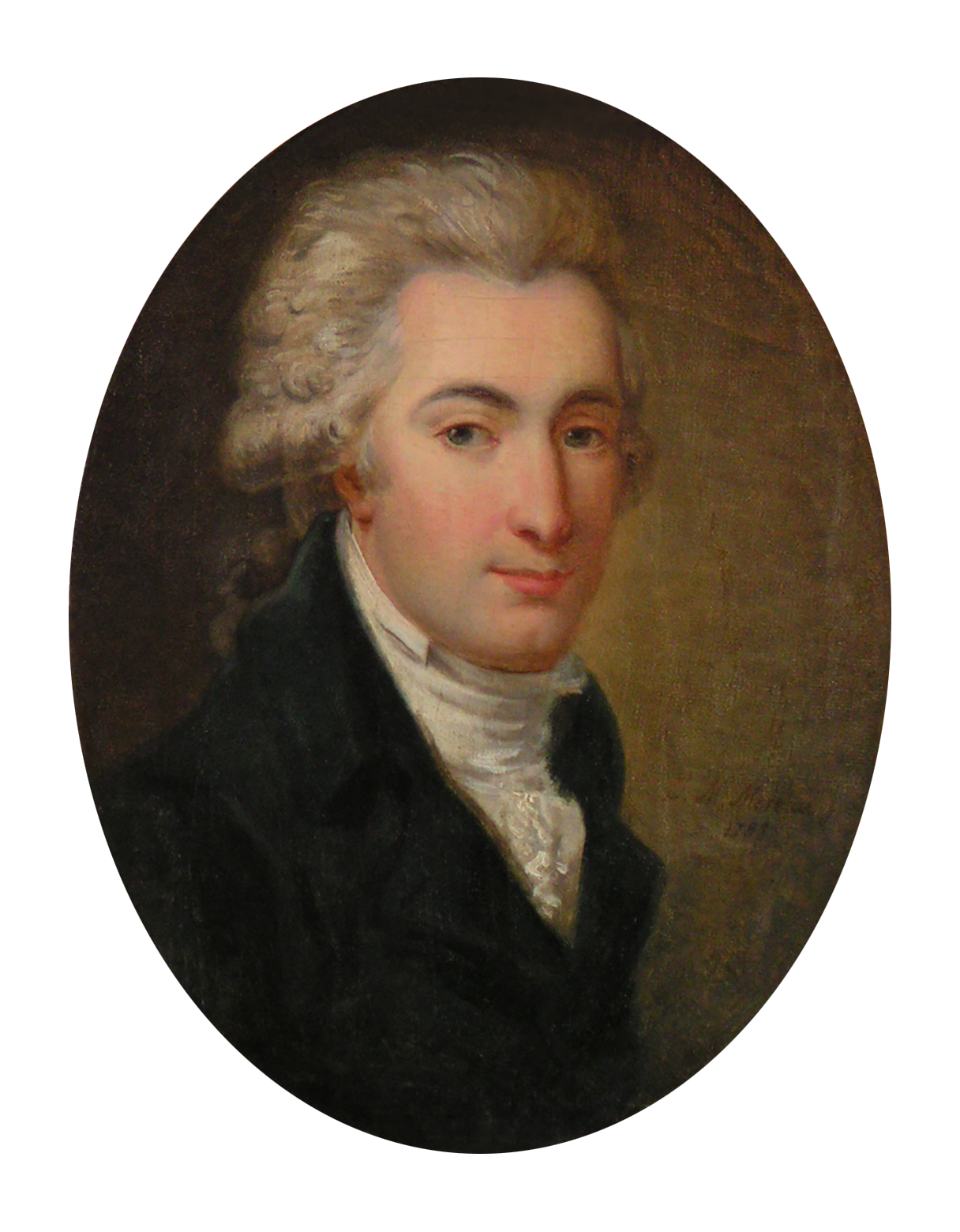
Portrait of Louis Antoine de Bourbon, Duke of Enghien, by Jean-Michel Moreau

Because Bonaparte's hold on political power was still tenuous, French royalists devised a plot that involved kidnapping and assassinating him and inviting Louis Antoine de Bourbon, the Duke of Enghien, to lead a coup d'état that would precede the restoration of the Bourbon monarchy with Louis XVIII on the throne. The British government of William Pitt the Younger had contributed to this royalist conspiracy by financing one million pounds and providing naval transport (with the ship of Captain John Wesley Wright) to the conspirators Georges Cadoudal and General Jean-Charles Pichegru for their return to France from England.

Pichegru met Moreau, one of Bonaparte's generals and a former protege of Pichegru, on 28 January 1804. The next day, a British secret agent named Courson was arrested and he, under torture, confessed that Pichegru, Moreau, and Cadoudal were conspiring to overthrow the consulate. The French government sought more details of this plot by arresting and torturing Louis Picot, Cadoudal's servant. General Joachim Murat ordered the city gates of Paris to be closed from 7 pm to 6 am while Pichegru and Moreau were arrested during the next month.

These further arrests revealed that the Royalist conspiracy would eventually involve the active participation of the Duke of Enghien, who was a relatively young Bourbon prince and thus another possible heir to a restored Bourbon monarchy. The Duke, at that time, was living as a French émigré in the Electorate of Baden, but he also kept a rented house in Ettenheim, which was close to the French border. Possibly at the urging of Charles Maurice de Talleyrand-Périogord, Bonaparte's foreign minister, and Joseph Fouché, Bonaparte's minister of police who had warned that "the air is full of daggers", the First Consul came to the conclusion that the Duke must be dealt with. Two hundred French soldiers crossed the border, surrounded the Duke's home in Baden and arrested him.

On the way back to France, d'Enghien stated that "he had sworn implacable hatred against Bonaparte as well as against the French; he would take every occasion to make war on them."

After three plots to assassinate him and the further financing of a supposed insurrection in Strasbourg, Bonaparte had enough. Based on d'Enghien's who were seized at his home in Germany and the material from the police, d'Enghien was charged as a conspirator in time of war and was subject to a military court. He was ordered to be tried by a court of seven colonels at Vincennes.

D'Enghien during his questioning at the court told them that he was being paid 4,200 pounds per year by Britain "in order to combat not France but a government to which his birth had made him hostile." Further, he stated that "I asked England if I might serve in her armies, but she replied that that was impossible: I must wait on the Rhine, where I would have a part to play immediately, and I was in fact waiting."

D'Enghien was found guilty of being in violation of Article 2 of a law of 6 October 1791, to wit, "Any conspiracy and plot aimed at disturbing the State by civil war, and arming the citizens against one another, or against lawful authority, will be punished by death." He was executed in the ditch of the fortress of Vincennes.

The aftermath caused hardly a ripple in France, but abroad, it produced a storm of anger. Many of those who had favoured or been neutral to Bonaparte now turned against him, but Bonaparte always assumed full responsibility for allowing the execution and continued to believe that, on balance, he had done the right thing.

== Consuls ==
Provisional consuls (10 November – 12 December 1799)
Napoleon Bonaparte	Emmanuel Joseph Sieyès	Roger Ducos
Consulate (12 December 1799 – 18 May 1804)
Napoleon Bonaparte; First Consul	J.J. Cambacérès; Second Consul	Charles-François Lebrun; Third Consul

== Ministers ==
The ministers under the Consulate were:
Ministry	Start	End	Minister
Foreign Affairs	11 November 1799	22 November 1799	Charles-Frédéric Reinhard
Foreign Affairs	22 November 1799	18 May 1804	Charles Maurice de Talleyrand-Périgord
Justice	11 November 1799	25 December 1799	Jean-Jacques-Régis de Cambacérès
Justice	25 December 1799	14 September 1802	André Joseph Abrial
Justice	14 September 1802	18 May 1804	Claude Ambroise Régnier
War	11 November 1799	2 April 1800	Louis-Alexandre Berthier
War	2 April 1800	8 October 1800	Lazare Carnot
War	8 October 1800	18 May 1804	Louis-Alexandre Berthier
Finance	11 November 1799	18 May 1804	Martin-Michel-Charles Gaudin
Police	11 November 1799	18 May 1804	Joseph Fouché
Interior	12 November 1799	25 December 1799	Pierre-Simon Laplace
Interior	25 December 1799	21 January 1801	Lucien Bonaparte
Interior	21 January 1801	18 May 1804	Jean-Antoine Chaptal
Navy and Colonies	12 November 1799	22 November 1799	Marc-Antoine Bourdon de Vatry
Navy and Colonies	22 November 1799	3 October 1801	Pierre-Alexandre-Laurent Forfait
Navy and Colonies	3 October 1801	18 May 1804	Denis Decrès
Secretary of State	25 December 1799	18 May 1804	Hugues-Bernard Maret
Treasury	27 September 1801	18 May 1804	François Barbé-Marbois
War Administration	12 March 1802	18 May 1804	Jean François Aimé Dejean

== See also ==
- History of France
- Nobility of the First French Empire

== Bibliography ==
- Histoire et Figurines website (English language version). Accessed October 2006.
- Tom Holmberg, "The d'Enghien Affair: Crime or Blunder?" (September 2005), The Napoleonic Series website. Accessed October 2006.
- "Louis Antoine Henri, duke of Enghien"
