= Constitution of the Year VIII =

1799 constitution of France

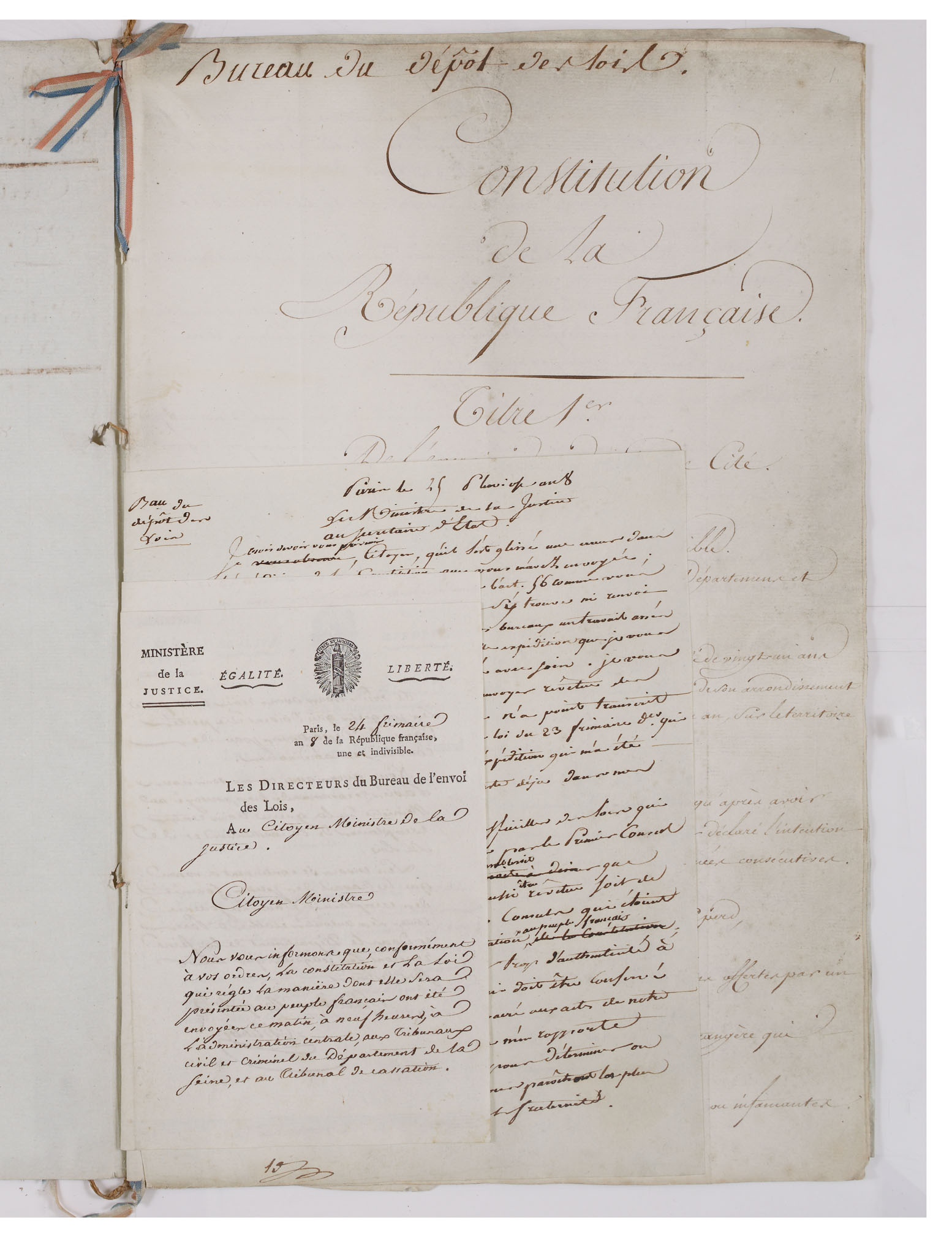
- The Constitution of the Year VIII (1799)

Overview
- Original title: Constitution de l'an VIII
- Jurisdiction: France
- Created: 22 Frimaire, Year VIII (13 December 1799)
- Presented: 24 Frimaire, Year VIII (15 December 1799)
- Chambers: Bicameral (Sénat conservateur and Corps législatif)
- Executive: Consulate
- Repealed: 16 Thermidor, Year X (4 August 1802)
- Location: French National Archives
- Authors: Initially Emmanuel Joseph Sieyès, later delegated to Daunou
- Supersedes: Constitution of 5 Fructidor, Year III (Constitution of the Directory)
- Superseded by: Constitution of the Year X

The Constitution of the Year VIII (French: Constitution de l'an VIII or French: Constitution du 22 frimaire an VIII) was a national constitution of France, adopted on 24 December 1799 (during Year VIII of the French Republican calendar), which established the form of government known as the Consulate. The coup of 18 Brumaire (9 November 1799) had effectively given all power to Napoleon Bonaparte, and in the eyes of some, ended the French Revolution.

After the coup, Napoleon and his allies legitimized his position by crafting a Constitution that would be, in the words of Napoleon, "short and obscure". The constitution tailor-made the position of First Consul to give Napoleon most of the powers of a dictator. It was the first constitution since the 1789 Revolution without a Declaration of Rights.

The document vested executive power in three Consuls, but all actual power was held by the First Consul, Bonaparte. This differed from Robespierre's republic of c.1792 to 1795 (which was more radical), and from the oligarchic liberal republic of the Directory (1795–1799). More than anything, the Consulat resembled the autocratic Roman Republic of Caesar Augustus, a conservative republic-in-name, which reminded the French of stability, order, and peace. It has been called a regime of "modern Caesarism". To emphasize this, the authors of the constitutional document used classical Roman terms, such as "Consul", "Senator" and "Tribune".

The Constitution of Year VIII established a legislature of three houses, which was composed of a Conservative Senate of 80 men over the age of 40, a Tribunate of 100 men over the age of 25, and a Legislative Body (Corps législatif) of 300 men over 30 years old.

The Constitution also used the term "notables". The word "notables" had been in common usage under the monarchy. It referred to prominent, "distinguished" men — landholders, merchants, scholars, professionals, clergymen and officials. The people in each district chose a slate of "notables" by popular vote. The First Consul, the Tribunate, and the Corps Législatif each nominated one Senatorial candidate to the rest of the Senate, which chose one candidate from among the three. Once all of its members were picked, it would then appoint the Tribunate, the Corps Législatif, the judges of cassation, and the commissioners of accounts from the National List of notables.

Napoleon held a plebiscite on the Constitution on 7 February 1800. The vote was not binding, but it allowed Napoleon to maintain a veneer of democracy. Lucien Bonaparte announced results of 3,011,007 in favor and 1,562 against the new dispensation. The true result was probably around 1.55 million for it, with several thousand against it.

This Constitution was amended, firstly, by the Constitution of the Year X, which made Napoleon First Consul for Life. A more extensive alteration, the Constitution of the Year XII, established the Bonaparte dynasty with Napoleon as a hereditary Emperor. The first, brief Bourbon Restoration of 1814 abolished the Napoleonic constitutional system, but the Emperor revived it and at once virtually replaced it with the so-called "Additional Act" of April 1815, promulgated on his return to power. The return of Louis XVIII in July 1815 (following the Hundred Days) saw the definitive abolition of Napoleon's constitutional arrangements. The Napoleonic constitutions were completely replaced by the Bourbon Charter of 1814.

== Background and adoption ==
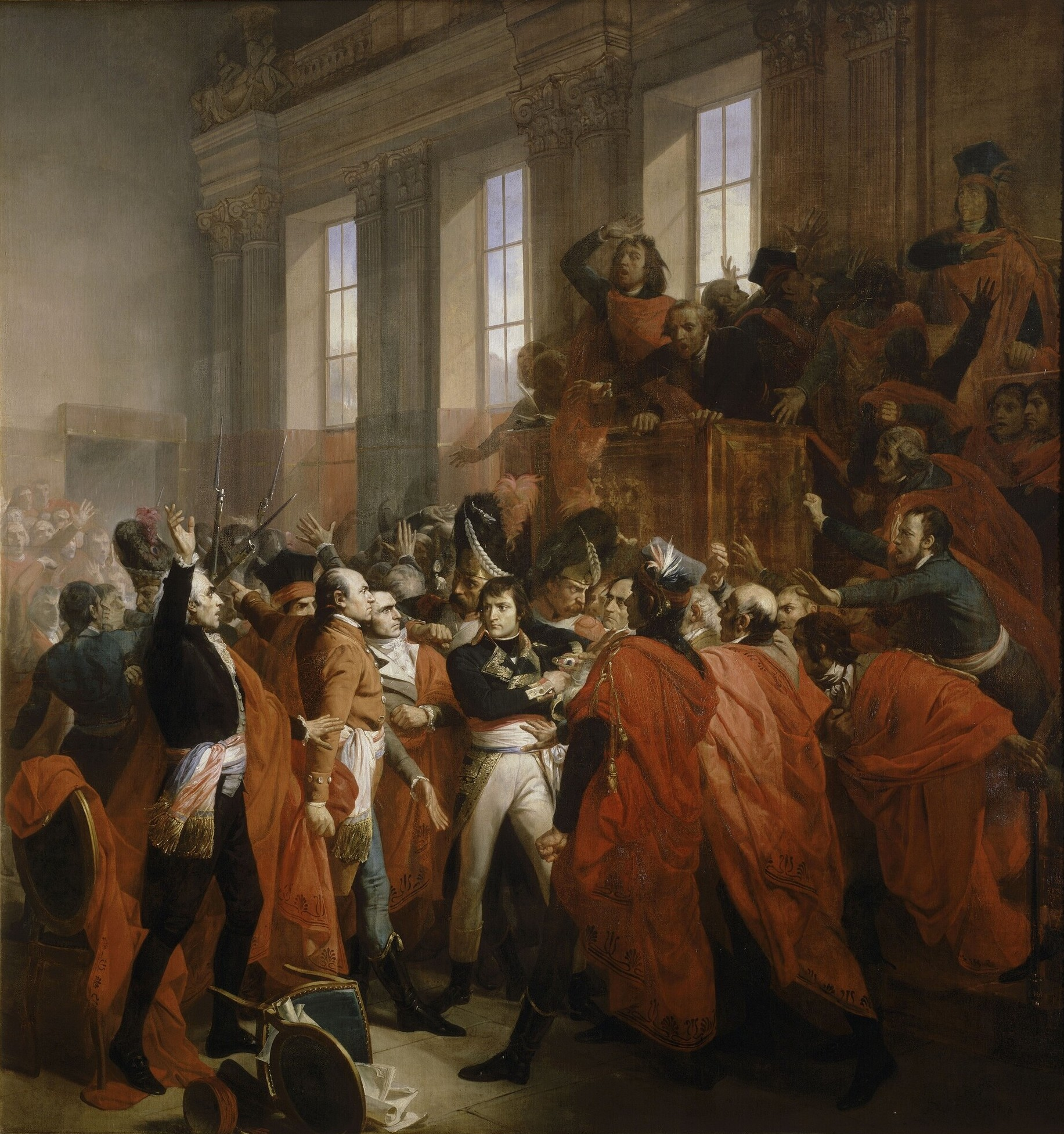
Napoleon Bonaparte during the coup d'état of 18 Brumaire. Bonaparte at the Council of Five Hundred at Saint-Cloud by François Bouchot

Following the refusal of the Council of Five Hundred to revise the Constitution of the Year III, Napoleon Bonaparte conducted a coup d'État on the 18th Brumaire of year VIII (9 November 1799) and took control of the government alongside the Abbot Sieyès and Roger Ducos, establishing a provisional consulate.

Napoléon proceeded to compose, alongside Sieyès, a new constitution aiming to assure a strong executive power, concentrated in Napoleon's hands. The assemblies designated a commission each for the preparation of a new constitution. Multiple sessions took place before Napoleon interfered to accelerate the process.

The Constitution of the Year VIII was composed in 11 days, principally by Pierre Claude François Daunou, who belonged to the Society of Ideologues (liberal republicans hostile to Jacobinism) and had had a significant role in writing the Constitution of the Year III. It was adopted on 13 December 1799, under pretext of emergency, before being ratified by a plebiscite which took place for 15 days, the official results of which were made public 7 February 1800.

Officially, the Constitution was approved by 3,011,107 citizens against 1,562 opposants, from a base of around 6 million voters registered in electoral lists. French historian Claude Langlois demonstrated in 1972 that the results of this plebiscite had been massively falsified by Napoleon's brother Lucien Bonaparte.

== New Constitutional Order ==
The Constitution of the Year VIII marks a break with the preceding constitutions- it allows Napoleon to exercise a personal power all the while maintaining an illusion of democracy. The text is very technical, and defines mainly the powers of the First Consul.

Unlike the preceding Republican Constitutions, the Constitution of the Year VIII does not feature a declaration of rights and freedoms. However, some rights are affirmed in general terms, such as the inviolability of the home, personal safety, and the right to petition.

The Constitution establishes universal masculine suffrage, but the electoral system does not allow a real expression of the citizens; in effect, elections are removed, with citizen unable to elect representants but limited to create "Lists of Confidence (or notability)". These were lists of candidates from which membres of the Assemblies, consuls, and functionaries are names or elected by the government or the Senate.

This universal suffrage is indirect, and proceeds in three stages:

1. The voters of each canton designate a tenth of them to constitute the district list. This list makes it possible to choose the public servants of the arrondissement. These members designate another tenth of them to constitute the departmental list.
2. This departmental list makes it possible to choose the officials of the department. These members designate another tenth of them to constitute the national list.
3. The national list makes it possible to choose national civil servants including members of the Legislative Body and the Tribunate.

In addition, the length of stay required of a foreigner to claim French citizenship increases: it is no longer seven years but ten years, or twice as long as the period provided for by the Legislative Assembly in 1791.

The Constitution appears "tailored" to Napoleon, to the point that he is designated explicitly and by name as the First Consul, highly unusual for a constitutional text, which is by definition destined to be permanently applicable. The designation by name of five citizens (Napoleon, Cambacérès, Lebrun, Sieyès, and Ducos) limits the applicability of the text to the lifetimes of the Consuls.

The Consulate is composed of three Consuls, but contrary to the Directory, the Second and Third Consuls only had a consultative power.

The powers of the First Consul are considerable. He names the main civil servants and has the right of initiative. Additionally, he is given significant powers in diplomacy and military affairs.

== Organs of Executive Power ==
=== Consulate ===
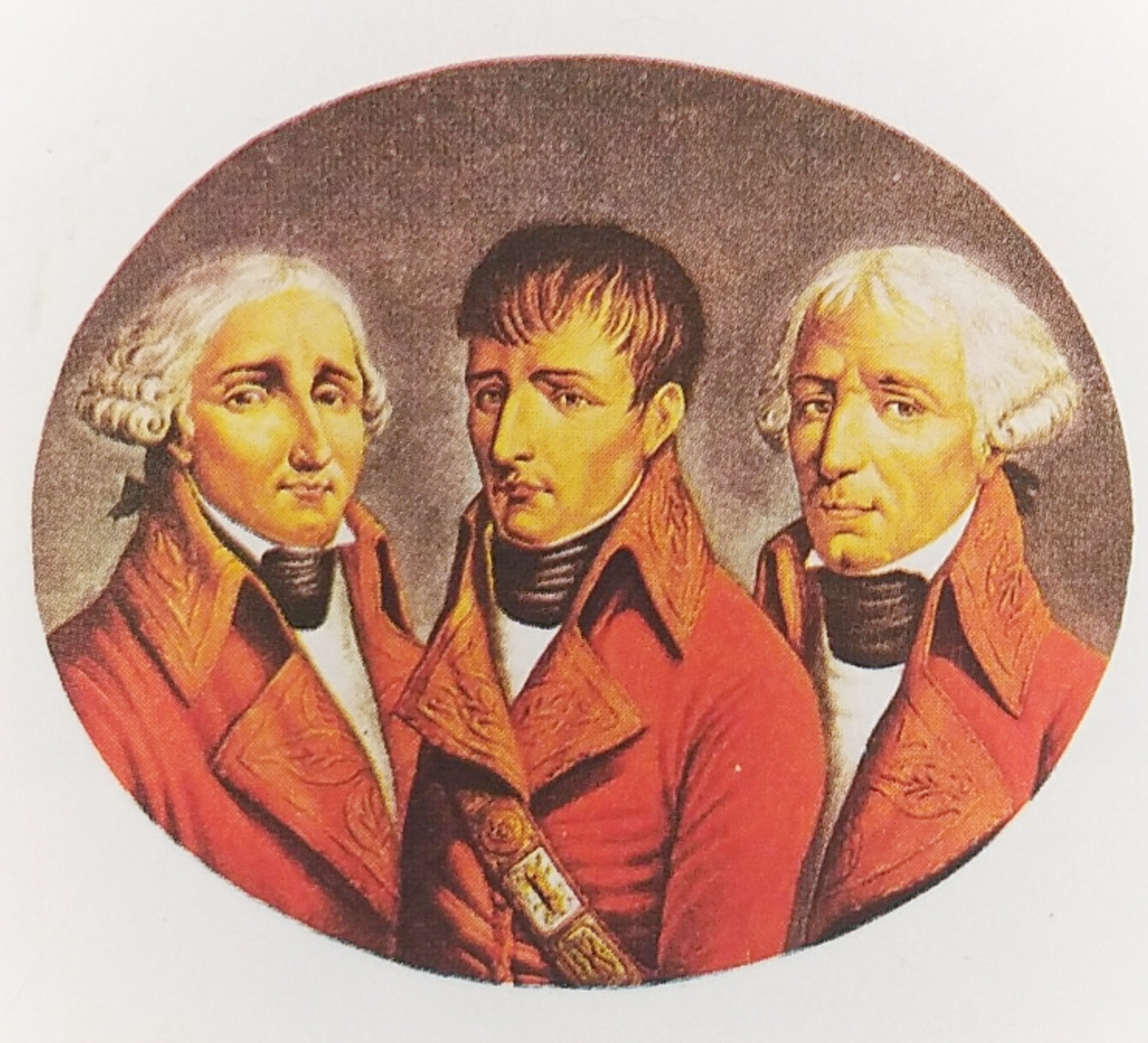
The three Consuls of the Year VIII: Cambacérès, Napoleon, and Lebrun.

The executive power, weakened during the Revolution, now holds the real political power, aided by the advisory role of the then newly-established Conseil d'État (Council of State). Executive power is wielded by the Consulate. Three Consuls are named for ten years and indefinitely re-electable by the Senate. The Second and Third Consul only being able to make their opinion known, executive power now effectively belongs to the First Consul, who also has a large amount of legislative power. He proposes and promulgates laws, names and revokes ministers and civil servants, and has no political responsibility.

The first three consuls designated by the Constitution of Year VIII are Napoléon Bonaparte, Jean-Jacques-Régis de Cambacérès, and Charles-François Lebrun.

The legislature is now weakened by its division in three assemblies: the Conservative Senate, the Tribunate, and the Legislative Body.

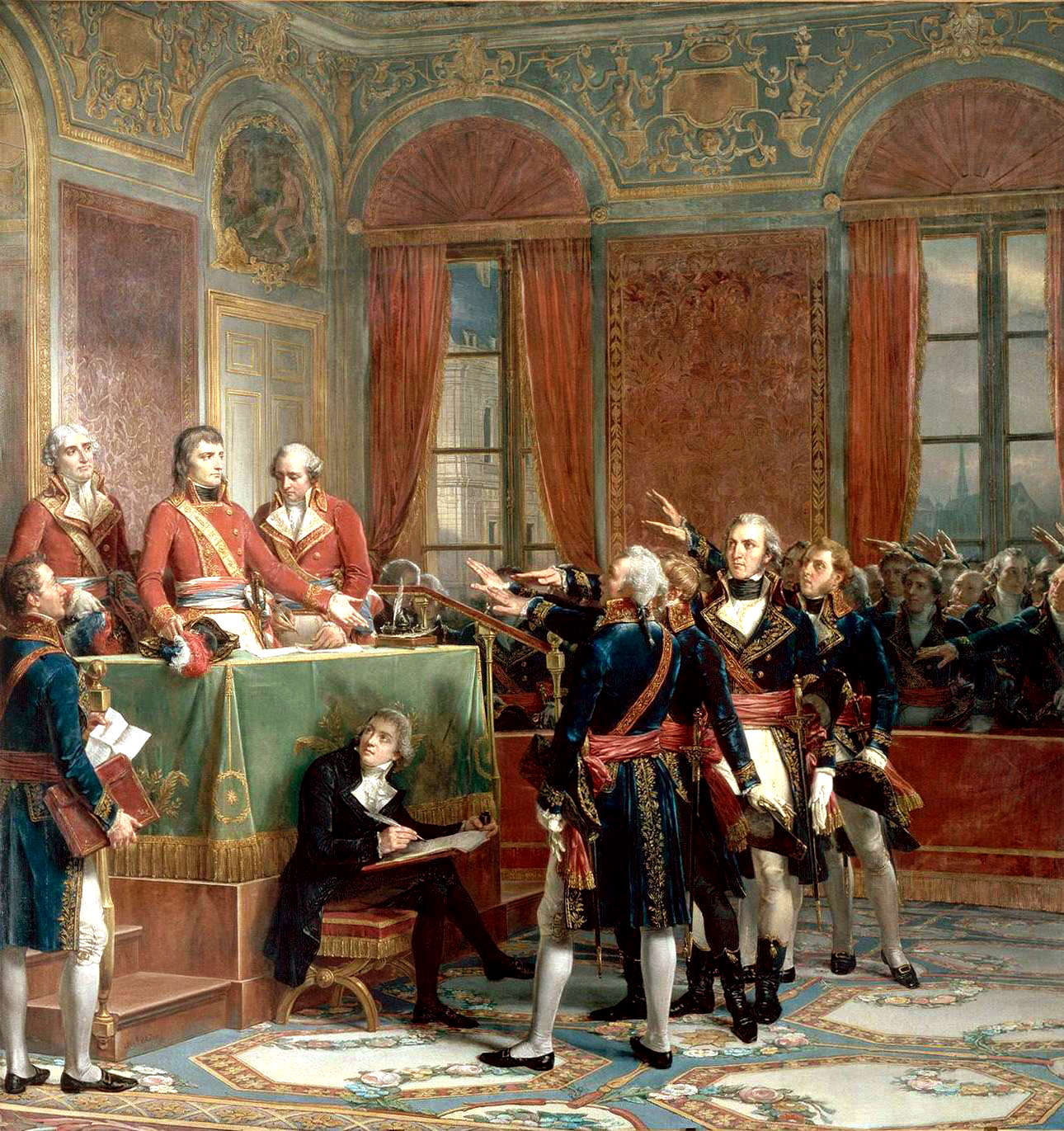
Installation of the Council of State at the Petit-Luxembourg, 25 December 1799, an 1856 painting by Auguste Couder.

=== Council of State ===
The Council of State (French: Conseil d'État) was established by the article 52 of the Constitution of the Year VIII. This council was designed as an instrument at the service of the executive, given various functions for this end: from the drafting of laws to the control of the administration, consisting of resolving disputes that arise in administrative matters, particularly between citizens and the State.

It consisted of between 30 and 50 members, appointed by the First Consul.

== Organs of Legislative Power ==
In an effort to weaken the legislative power, it was divided into three organs: two assemblies, the Tribunate (French: Tribunat) and the Legislative Body (Corps législatif); and the Conservative Senate (Sénat conservateur).

=== Tribunate ===
Composed of 100 men over the age of 25 selected by the Senate from the lists of Notability, the Tribunate had the role of discussing laws proposed by the Government. The Tribunate could express its opinion on laws made or to be made, on possible corrections, or improvements to be made in all areas of public administration. The Tribunate then designated three speakers who would defend its position before the Legislative Body.

=== Legislative Body ===
The Legislative Body was composed of 300 members over the age of 30, selected likewise by the Senate from national lists of notability. It was tasked with voting on the laws discussed by the Tribunate, without being able to modify or discuss them. For this reason, it was sometimes facetiously called the "mute assembly". The Legislative Body then voted for or against the Tribunate's proposal. If adopted, the bill became a "decretal" (French: Décret) of the Legislative Body, able to be promulgated as law.

=== Conservative Senate ===
The Sénat conservateur comprised 80 members made over the age of 40. This figure of 80 members was to be reached gradually; 60 members were appointed in the Year VIII, to which were to be added two additional members each year, for ten years. The Constitution of the Year VIII explicitly named Sieyès and Roger-Ducos, outgoing Second and Third Consuls, as ex officio members of the Senate. They were tasked with appointing the majority of the Senate, in consultation with Cambacérès and Lebrun, the new Second and Third Consuls.

Unlike the Tribunate and the Legislative Body, the Senate had no role in the legislative process. However, it had significant power over the two assemblies, in elective and constitutional matters.

The Senate, presided by Napoleon himself, names the members of the two assemblies. Its other mission was to ensure the constitutionality of laws; as the "conservator of the Constitution" (from which it gets its name), it could block the promulgation of a text voted by the Legislative Body.

== Sources ==
Connelly, Owen (2000). The French Revolution and Napoleonic Era. 3rd Edition. Fort Worth, TX: Harcourt. pp. 201–203.
