= 1802 French constitutional referendum =

1802 referendum in France

- 10 May 1802
- Should Napoleon Bonaparte be consul for life?

Results
Choice	Votes	%
Yes	3,653,600	99.77%
No	8,374	0.23%
Valid votes	3,661,974	100.00%
Invalid or blank votes	0	0.00%
Total votes	3,661,974	100.00%

A referendum ratifying the new constitution of the Consulate, which made Napoleon Bonaparte First Consul for life, was held on 10 May 1802. The question asked to the voters was: "Should Napoleon Bonaparte be consul for life?". Out of an electorate of 7 million, 3,653,600 voted in favor, and 8,374 voted against.

There was no secret ballot, with voters having to record their vote next to their name in registers of votes, thus forcing the opponents of Bonaparte to register themselves and to face potential police harassment. Nevertheless, turnout increased by over 8 percentage points compared to the 1800 French constitutional referendum, with an additional 2.1 million voters voting yes at the ballot. Given the turnout, the 1802 referendum is regarded as a success for the Napoleonic regime.

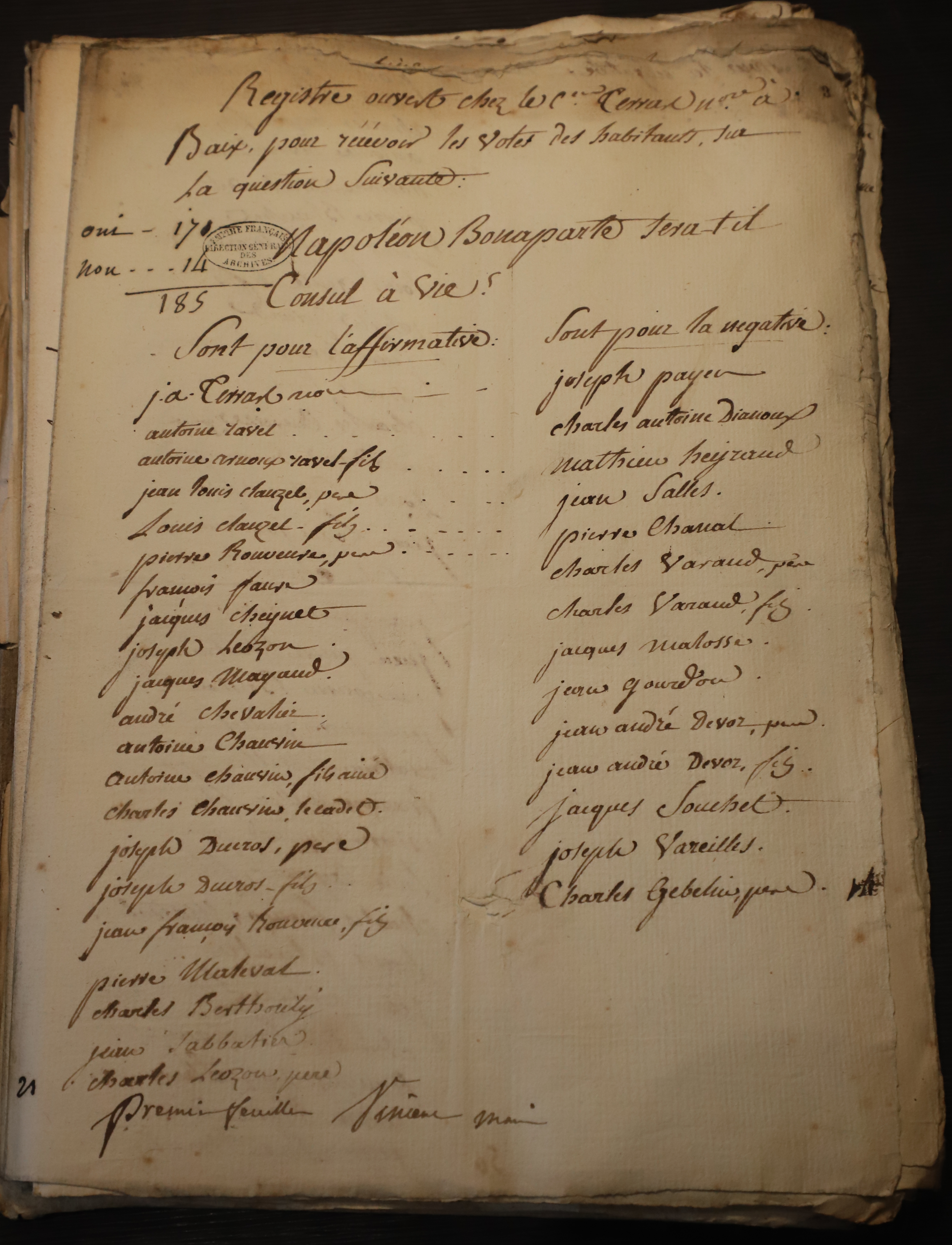
Registry from Baix, Ardeche, about the 1802 referendum asking the question : "Will Napoleon Bonaparte be first consul for life ?"

Vote	% of votes	Votes
Yes	99.77%	3,653,600
No	0.23%	8,374
Total	100%	

No : 8,374 (0.23%)	Yes : 3,653,600 (99.77%)
▲
