= What Is the Third Estate? =

Pamphlet by Emmanuel Joseph Sieyès

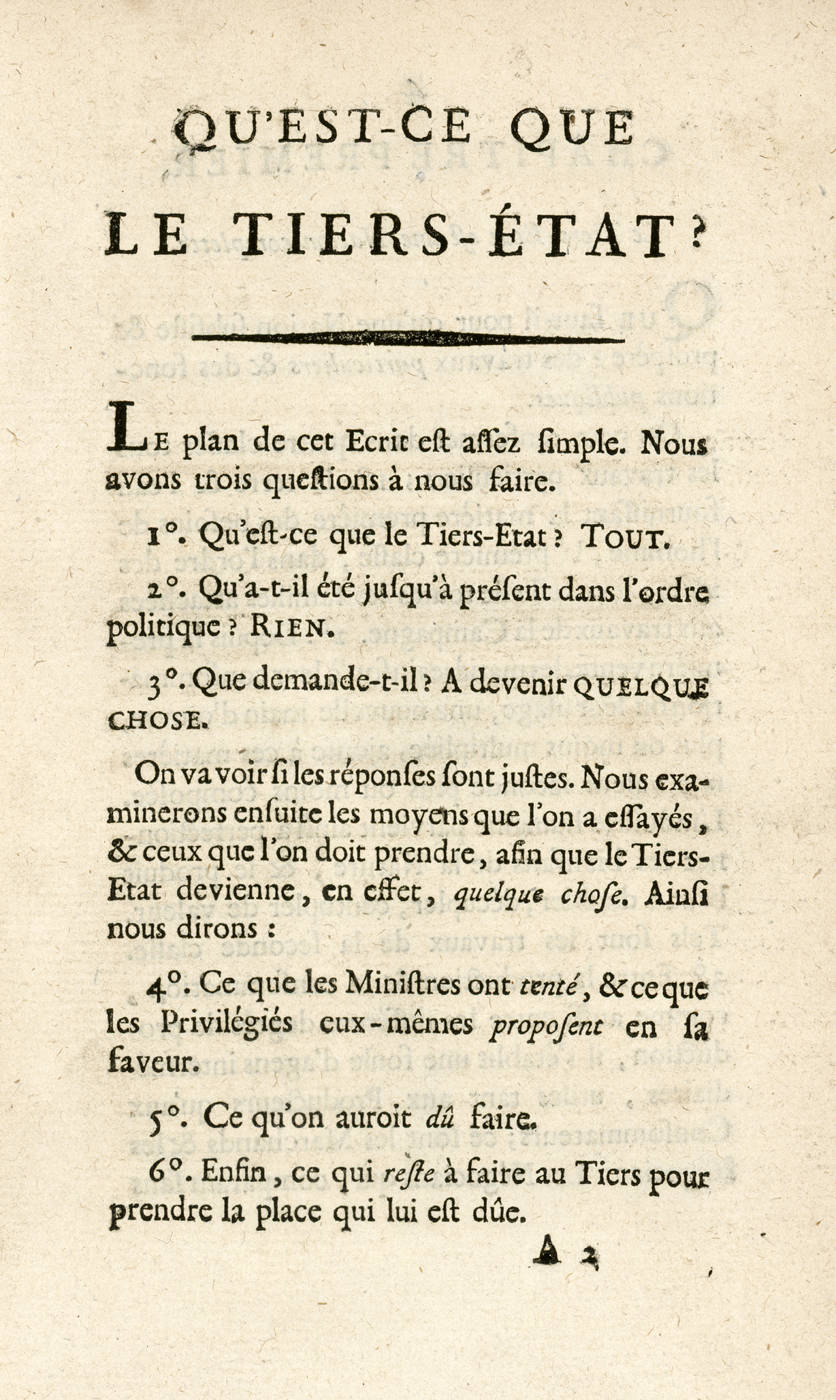
The first page of Qu'est-ce que le Tiers Etat?

Qu'est-ce que le Tiers-État? (transl. What Is the Third Estate?) is an influential political pamphlet published in January 1789, shortly before the outbreak of the French Revolution, by the French writer and clergyman Abbé Emmanuel Joseph Sieyès (1748–1836). Written during the Assembly of Notables between 6 November and 12 December 1788, it was sent to the printer by 27 December 1788 for publication in the early days of 1789. There were eventually four editions of the text; initially published anonymously as a 127 page pamphlet, Sieyès revealed himself as the author after its third edition in May 1789.

The pamphlet was Sieyès' reply to finance minister Jacques Necker's invitation for writers to state how they thought the Estates-General should be organised. It was one of the most influential pamphlets of the early revolution: some 300,000 copies were printed, reaching around one million readers, establishing Sieyès as one of the principal leaders of the Estates-General upon its opening in May.

In the pamphlet, Sieyès argues that the third estate – the common people of France – constituted a complete nation within itself, providing in the end all the men necessary to man the army, to staff the churches, to administer the law, and every other operation of society. It therefore had no need of the dead weight of the two other orders – the first and second estates of the, respectively, clergy and aristocracy – which Sieyès suggested abolishing. Before all else Sieyès argued for the sovereignty of the nation, unfettered by ancient constitutional niceties, represented by its people and empowered to re-establish the political system. He saw this actualised with genuine representatives in the Estates-General, equal representation to the other two orders taken together, and votes taken by heads and not by orders.

Comparable to the Federalist Papers and the Communist Manifesto in its influence, Sieyès' pamphlet was profoundly influential in putting forth the ideas and goals of the French Revolution.

== Summary ==
The pamphlet begins with three rhetorical questions and Sieyès' responses. The questions and responses are:

- What is the Third Estate? Everything.
- What has it been hitherto in the political order? Nothing.
- What does it desire? To become something.

Throughout the pamphlet, Sieyès argues that the first and second estates are simply unnecessary, and that the Third Estate is in truth France's only legitimate estate, representing as it does the entire population. Thus, he asserts, it should replace the other two estates entirely.

== See also ==
- Estates of the realm
- Modern era and modernism
- Pluralism (political philosophy)
