= Emmanuel Joseph Sieyès =

French Roman Catholic abbé and political writer (1748–1836)

His Excellency Emmanuel Joseph Sieyès LH OR
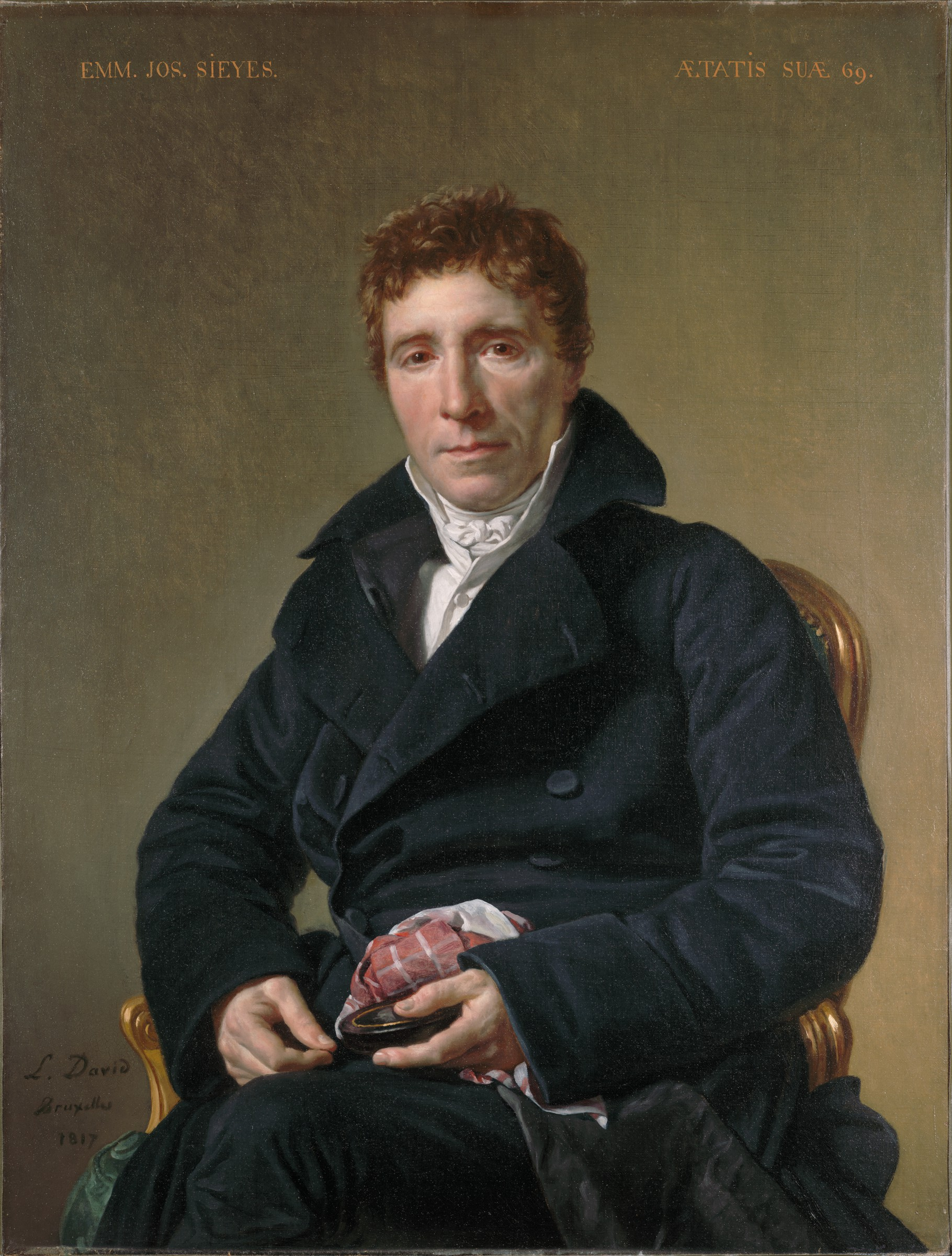
- Portrait by Jacques-Louis David, 1817

President of the Conservative Senate
- In office 27 December 1799 – 13 February 1800
- President: Napoleon Bonaparte
- Succeeded by: François Barthélemy

Provisional Consul of France
- In office 10 November 1799 – 12 December 1799 Serving with Napoléon Bonaparte and Roger Ducos
- Preceded by: Office created
- Succeeded by: Jean-Jacques-Régis de Cambacérès (as Second Consul)

Member of the Directory
- In office 17 June 1799 – 10 November 1799
- Preceded by: Jean-François Rewbell

President of the Council of Five Hundred
- In office 21 November 1797 – 20 December 1797
- Preceded by: François-Toussaint Villers
- Succeeded by: Antoine Boulay de la Meurthe

President of the National Convention
- In office 20 April 1795 – 5 May 1795
- Preceded by: François Antoine de Boissy d'Anglas
- Succeeded by: Théodore Vernier

Member of the National Convention
- In office 20 September 1792 – 2 November 1795
- Constituency: Var

Member of the Estates General for the Third Estate
- In office 5 May 1789 – 9 July 1789
- Constituency: Var

Personal details
- Born: 3 May 1748 Fréjus, France
- Died: 20 June 1836 (aged 88) Paris, France
- Resting place: Père Lachaise Cemetery
- Party: The Plain (1791–1795)
- Education: Saint-Sulpice Seminary
- Profession: Catholic priest, writer
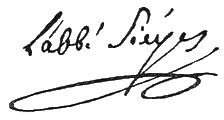
- Signature

Emmanuel Joseph Sieyès (3 May 1748 – 20 June 1836), usually known as the Abbé Sieyès (traditional French pronunciation: [sijɛːs]; modern pronunciation: [sjejɛs]), was a French Catholic priest, abbé, and political writer who was a leading political theorist of the French Revolution (1789–1799). He also held offices in the governments of the French Consulate (1799–1804) and the First French Empire (1804–1815).

His pamphlet What Is the Third Estate? (1789) became the political manifesto of the Revolution, which facilitated transforming the Estates-General into the National Assembly, in June 1789. Later that year he played a major role in the final drafting of the Declaration of the Rights of Man and of the Citizen. He was offered and refused an office in the French Directory (1795–1799). After becoming a director in 1799, Sieyès was among the instigators of the Coup of 18 Brumaire (9 November), which installed Napoleon Bonaparte in power.

In addition to his political and clerical life, Sieyès coined the term "sociologie", and contributed to the nascent social sciences.

== Early life ==
Emmanuel-Joseph Sieyès was born on 3 May 1748, the fifth child of Honoré and Annabelle Sieyès, in the southern French town of Fréjus. Honoré Sieyès was a local tax collector of modest income. Although they claimed some noble blood, the family Sieyès were commoners. Emmanuel-Joseph received his earliest education from tutors and Jesuits, and later attended the collège of the Doctrinaires of Draguignan.

His ambition to become a professional soldier was thwarted by frail health, which, combined with the piety of his parents, led to pursuing a religious career. To that effect, the vicar-general of Fréjus aided Emmanuel-Joseph, out of obligation to his father, Honoré.

== Education ==
Sieyès spent ten years at the seminary of Saint-Sulpice in Paris. There, he studied theology and engineering to prepare himself to enter the priesthood. He quickly gained a reputation at the school for his aptitude and interest in the sciences, combined with his obsession over the "new philosophic principles" and dislike for conventional theology.

Sieyès was educated for priesthood in the Catholic Church at the Sorbonne. While there, he became influenced by the teachings of John Locke, David Hume, Edward Gibbon, Voltaire, Jean-Jacques Rousseau, Denis Diderot, Condillac, Quesnay, Mirabeau, Turgot, the Encyclopédistes, and other Enlightenment political thinkers, all in preference to theology. In 1770, he obtained his first theology diploma, ranking at the bottom of the list of passing candidates – a reflection of his antipathy toward his religious education. In 1772, he was ordained as a priest, and two years later he obtained his theology license.

== Religious career ==
Despite Sieyès' embrace of Enlightenment thinking, he was ordained to the priesthood in 1773, but was not hired immediately. He spent time researching philosophy and developing music until about a year later in October 1774 when, as the result of demands by powerful friends, he was promised a canonry in Brittany. Unfortunately for Sieyès, this canonry went into effect only when the preceding holder died. At the end of 1775, Sieyès acquired his first real position as secretary to the bishop of Tréguier where he spent two years as deputy of the diocese. It is here that he sat in the Estates of Brittany and became disgusted with the immense power the privileged classes held.

In 1780, the bishop of Tréguier was transferred to the bishopric of Chartres, and Sieyès accompanied him there as his vicar general, eventually becoming a canon of the cathedral and chancellor of the diocese of Chartres. Due to the fact that the bishop of Tréguier had high regards for Sieyès, he was able to act as a representative of his diocese in the Upper Chamber of the Clergy. It was during this time that Sieyès became aware of the ease with which nobles advanced in ecclesiastical offices compared to commoners. In particular, he was resentful of the privileges granted to the nobles within the Church system and thought the patronage system was a humiliation for commoners.

While remaining in ecclesiastical offices, Sieyès maintained a religious cynicism at odds with his position. By the time he determined to enter priesthood, Sieyès had "freed himself from all superstitious sentiments and ideas". Even when corresponding with his deeply religious father, Sieyès showed a severe lack of piety for the man in charge of the diocese of Chartres. It is theorised that Sieyès accepted a religious career not because he had any sort of strong religious inclination, but because he considered it the only means to advance his career as a political writer.

== What Is the Third Estate? ==
In 1788, King Louis XVI proposed the convocation of the Estates-General of France after an interval of more than a century and a half. This proposal, and Jacques Necker's invitation to French writers to state their views as to the organization of society by Estates, enabled Sieyès to publish his celebrated January 1789 pamphlet, Qu'est-ce que le tiers-état? (What Is the Third Estate?). He begins his answer:

What is the Third Estate? Everything. What has it been hitherto in the political order? Nothing. What does it desire to be? Something.

This phrase, which was to remain famous, is said to have been inspired by Nicolas Chamfort.

The term constituting power, the power to remake the political order, is closely related to constituent power. In this pamphlet, Sieyès framed these concepts against constituted power, the power to preserve established order, writing "La constitution n'est pas l'ouvrage du pouvoir constitué, mais du pouvoir constituant" (The constitution is not the work of constituted power, but of constituting or constituent power). Sieyès used this argument to locate constituting power in pre-legal sovereignty of the nation (popular sovereignty), lending political legitimacy to the Third Estate as an absolute revolutionary agent. As a matter of conceptual history, there are some early modern period antecedents (e.g., English Jesuits exploring models of what may be called constituting power in the 1752 Treatise of Treasons to restrain what they saw as Elizabeth I's illegitimate expansion of monarchical authority).

=== Reception ===
The pamphlet was very successful, and its author, despite his clerical vocation (which made him part of the First Estate), was elected as the last (the twentieth) of the deputies to the Third Estate from Paris to the Estates-General. He played his main role in the opening years of the Revolution, participating in the final drafting of the Declaration of the Rights of Man and of the Citizen, expanding on the theories of national sovereignty, popular sovereignty, and representation implied in his pamphlet, with a distinction between active and passive citizens that justified suffrage limited to male owners of property.

Sieyès's pamphlet incited a radical reaction from its audience because it involved the "political issues of the day and twisted them in a more revolutionary direction". In the third chapter of the pamphlet, Sieyès proposed that the Third Estate wanted to be "something". But he also stated that, in allowing the privileged orders to exist, they are asking to become "the least thing possible". The usage of such rhetoric in his pamphlet appealed to common causes to unite the audience. At the same time it influenced them to move beyond simple demands and take a more radical position on the nature of government. In this case, the radical position taken by the Third Estate created a sense of awareness that the problems of France were not simply a matter of addressing "royal tyranny", but that unequal privileges under the law had divided the nation. It was from this point that the Revolution's struggle for fair distribution of power and equal rights began in earnest.

=== Influence ===
Sieyès's pamphlet played a key role in shaping the currents of revolutionary thought that propelled France towards the French Revolution. In his pamphlet, he outlined the desires and frustrations of the alienated class of people that made up the Third Estate. He attacked the foundations of the French Ancien Régime by arguing the nobility to be a fraudulent institution, preying on an overburdened and despondent bourgeoisie. The pamphlet voiced concerns that were to become crucial matters of debate during the convocation of the Estates-General of 1789.

Whereas the aristocracy defined themselves as an élite ruling class charged with maintaining the social order in France, Sieyès saw the Third Estate as representing the nation whether or not the other two orders were present. The pamphlet placed sovereignty not in the hands of aristocrats but instead defined the nation of France by its productive orders composed of those who would generate services and produce goods for the benefit of the entire society. These included not only those involved in agricultural labor and craftsmanship, but also merchants, brokers, lawyers, financiers and others providing services.

Sieyès challenged the hierarchical order of society by redefining who represented the nation. In his pamphlet, he condemns the privileged orders by saying their members were enjoying the best products of society without contributing to their production. Sieyès essentially argued that the aristocracy's privileges established it as an alien body acting outside of the nation of France, and deemed noble privilege "treason to the commonwealth".

Sieyès's pamphlet had a significant influence on the structural concerns that arose surrounding the convocation of the Estates general. Specifically, the Third Estate demanded that the number of deputies for their order be equal to that of the two privileged orders combined, and most controversially "that the States General Vote, Not by Orders, but by Heads". The pamphlet took these issues to the masses and their partial appeasement was met with revolutionary reaction. By addressing the issues of representation directly, Sieyès inspired resentment and agitation that united the third estate against the feudalistic traditions of the Ancien Régime.

As a result, the Third Estate demanded the reorganization of the Estates General, but the two other orders proved unable or unwilling to provide a solution. Sieyès proposed that the members of the First and Second order join the Third Estate and become a united body to represent the nation as a whole. He stated that the Third Estate had the right to consider those who denied this invitation to be in default of their national responsibility. The Third Estate adopted this measure on 5 June 1789. By doing so, they assumed the authority to represent the nation. Sieyès convinced the Third Estate to adopt the term National Assembly and was elected by the Assembly to its constitutional committee in July 1789.

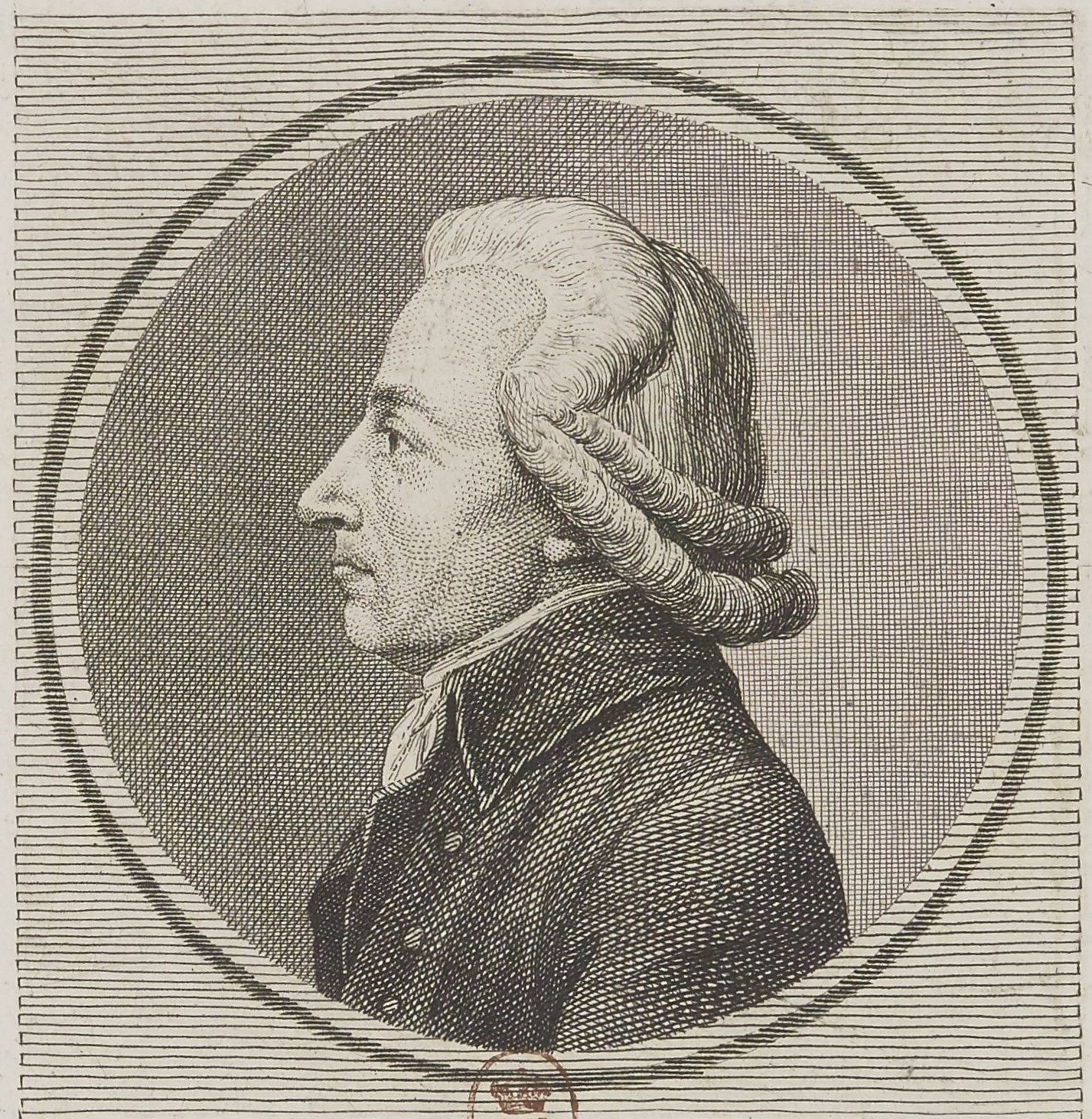
Sieyès around 1789

Serving on the constitutional committee, Sieyès argued that the Assembly should not need to seek the King's approval on constitutional matters. Sieyès advocated for equality of voting power, a unicameral legislative body, and the absence of a royal veto over the actions of the legislature. Taking the position that the National Assembly held absolute power as the only true representative of the nation, Sieyès rejected arguments that the King should be able to initiate new elections for the Assembly or have the power to veto legislation.

Sieyès believed that representatives to the Assembly must be free both from influence from above by the King and from influence from below by the people. While voters had the right to put into or take out representatives from power, for the term they were elected, Sieyès held, representatives should be answerable to no one. In September 1789, Sieyès triumphed over the more moderate members of the Assembly led by Mounier when the Assembly voted for a unicameral legislature by a vote of 849 to 89 with 122 abstaining.

== Assemblies, Convention, and the Terror ==
Although not noted as a public speaker as he spoke rarely and briefly, Sieyès held major political influence, and he recommended the decision of the Estates to reunite its chamber as the National Assembly; he opposed the abolition of tithes and the confiscation of Church lands. His opposition to the abolition of tithes discredited him in the National Assembly, and he was never able to regain his authority.

Elected to the special committee on the constitution, he opposed the right of "absolute veto" for the King of France, which Honoré de Mirabeau unsuccessfully supported. He had considerable influence on the framing of the departmental system; after the spring of 1790, he was eclipsed by other politicians, and was elected only once to the post of fortnightly president of the Constituent Assembly.

Like all other members of the Constituent Assembly, he was excluded from the Legislative Assembly by the ordinance, initially proposed by Maximilien Robespierre, that decreed that none of its members should be eligible for the next legislature. He reappeared in the third national Assembly, known as the National Convention of the French Republic (September 1792 – September 1795). He voted for the death of Louis XVI, but not in the contemptuous terms sometimes ascribed to him. He participated to the Constitution Committee that drafted the Girondin constitutional project. Menaced by the Reign of Terror and offended by its character, Sieyès even abjured his faith at the time of the installation of the Cult of Reason; afterwards, when asked what he had done during the Terror, he famously replied, "J'ai vécu" ("I lived").

Ultimately, Sieyès failed to establish the kind of bourgeois revolution he had hoped for, one of representative order "devoted to the peaceful pursuit of material comfort". His initial purpose was to instigate change in a more passive way, and to establish a constitutional monarchy. According to William Sewell, Sieyès' pamphlet set "the tone and direction of The French Revolution … but its author could hardly control the Revolution's course over the long run". Even after 1791, when the monarchy seemed to many to be doomed, Sieyès "continued to assert his belief in the monarchy", which indicated he did not intend for the Revolution to take the course it did. During the period he served in the National Assembly, Sieyès wanted to establish a constitution that would guarantee the rights of French men and would uphold equality under the law as the social goal of the Revolution; he was ultimately unable to accomplish his goal.

== Directory ==
After the execution of Robespierre in 1794, Sieyès reemerged as an important political player during the constitutional debates that followed. In 1795, he went on a diplomatic mission to The Hague, and was instrumental in drawing up a treaty between the French and Batavian republics. He resented the Constitution of the Year III enacted by the Directory, and refused to serve as a Director of the Republic. In May 1798, he went as the plenipotentiary of France to the court of Berlin, in order to try to induce Prussia to ally with France against the Second Coalition; this effort ultimately failed. His prestige grew nonetheless, and he was made Director of France in place of Jean-François Rewbell in May 1799.

Nevertheless, Sieyès considered ways to overthrow the Directory, and is said to have taken in view the replacement of the government with unlikely rulers such as Archduke Charles of Austria and Karl Wilhelm Ferdinand of Brunswick, a major enemy of the Revolution. He attempted to undermine the constitution, and thus caused the revived Jacobin Club to be closed while making offers to General Joubert for a coup d'état.

== Second Consul of France ==
The death of Joubert at the Battle of Novi and the return of Napoleon Bonaparte from the Egypt campaign put an end to this project, but Sieyès regained influence by reaching a new understanding with Bonaparte. In the coup of 18 Brumaire, Sieyès and his allies dissolved the Directory, allowing Napoleon to seize power. Thereafter, Sieyès produced the constitution which he had long been planning, only to have it completely remodeled by Bonaparte, who thereby achieved a coup within a coup – Bonaparte's Constitution of the Year VIII became the basis of the French Consulate of 1799–1804.

The Corps législatif appointed Bonaparte, Sieyès, and Roger Ducos as "Consuls of the French Republic". In order to once again begin the function of government, these three men took the oath of "Inviolable fidelity to the sovereignty of the people; to the French Republic, one and indivisible; to equality, liberty and the representative system".

Although Sieyès had many ideas, a lot of them were disfavored by Bonaparte and Roger-Ducos. One aspect that was agreed upon was the structure of power. A list of active citizens formed the basis of the proposed political structure. This list was to choose one-tenth of its members to form a communal list eligible for local office. From the communal list, one-tenth of its members were to form a departmental list. A further list was made up from one-tenth of the members of the departmental list, to create a national list. This national list is where the highest officials of the land were to be chosen.

Sieyès envisioned a Tribunat and a College des Conservateurs to act as the shell of the national government. The Tribunat would present laws and discuss ratification of these laws in front of a jury. This jury would not have any say in terms of what the laws granted consist of, but rather whether or not these laws passed. The College des Conservateurs would be renewed from the national list. The main responsibility of the College des Conservateurs was to choose the members of the two legislative bodies, and protect the constitution by right of absorption.

By this curious provision, the College could forcibly elect to its ranks any individual deemed dangerous to the safety of the state, who would then be disqualified from any other office. This was a way to keep a closer eye on anyone who threatened the state. The power of the College des Conservateurs was extended to electing the titular head of government, the Grand-Electeur. The Grand-Electeur would hold office for life but have no power. If the Grand-Electeur threatened to become dangerous, the College des Conservateurs would absorb him. The central idea of Sieyès' plan was a division of power.

== Napoleonic era and final years ==
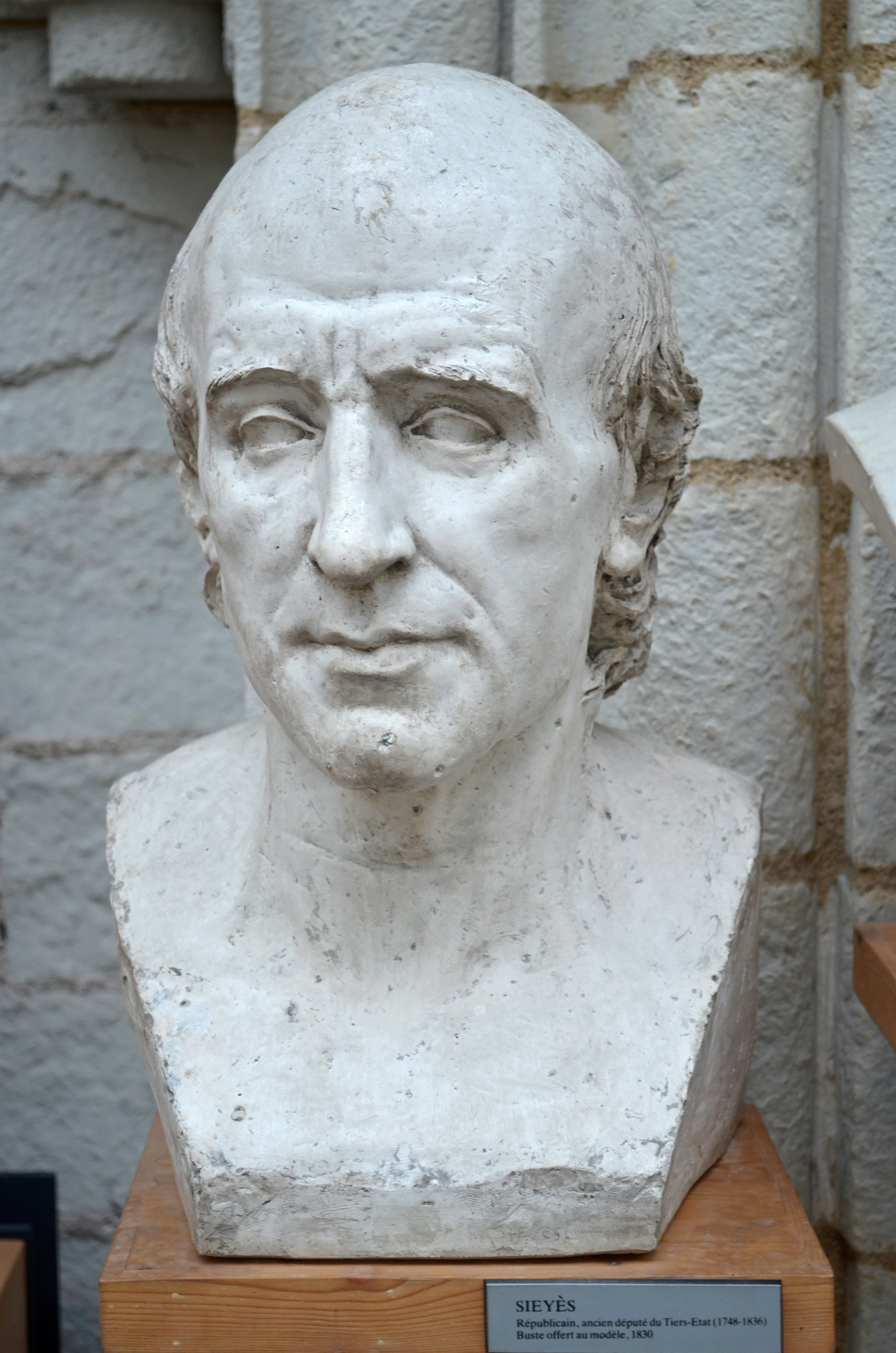
A bust of Sieyès by David d'Angers (1838)

Sieyès soon retired from the post of provisional Consul, which he had accepted after 18 Brumaire, and became one of the first members of the Sénat conservateur, acting as its president in 1799. This concession was attributed to the large estate at Crosne that he received from Napoleon. After the plot of the Rue Saint-Nicaise in late December 1800, Sieyès defended the arbitrary and illegal proceedings whereby Napoleon rid himself of the leading Jacobins.

During the era of the First Empire (1804–1814), Sieyès rarely emerged from his retirement. When Napoleon briefly returned to power in 1815, Sieyès was named to the Chamber of Peers. In 1816, after the Second Restoration, Sieyès was expelled from the Academy of Moral and Political Sciences by Louis XVIII. He then moved to Brussels, but returned to France after the July Revolution of 1830. He died in Paris in 1836, at the age of 88.

== Contribution to social sciences ==
In 1795, Sieyès became one of the first members of what would become the Academy of Moral and Political Sciences of the Institute of France. When the Académie Française was reorganized in 1803, he was elected in the second class, replacing, in chair 31, Jean Sylvain Bailly, who had been guillotined on 12 November 1793 during the Reign of Terror. After the second Restoration in 1815, Sieyès was expelled for his role in the execution of King Louis XVI, and was replaced by the Marquis of Lally-Tollendal, who was named to the Academy by a royal decree.

In 1780, Sieyès coined the term sociologie in an unpublished manuscript. The term was used again fifty years later by the philosopher Auguste Comte to refer to the science of society, which is known in English as sociology. Sieyès was also among the first to employ the term science sociale.

== Personal life ==
Sieyès was always considered intellectual and intelligent by his peers and mentors alike. Through the virtue of his own thoughts, he progressed in his ideologies from personal experiences. Starting at a young age, he began to feel repulsion towards the privileges of the nobility. He deemed this advantage gained by noble right as unfair to those of the lower class. This distaste he felt for the privileged class became evident during his time at the Estates of Brittany where he was able to observe, with dissatisfaction, domination by the nobility.

Aside from his opinions towards nobility, Sieyès also had a passion for music. He devoted himself assiduously to cultivating music as he had plenty of spare time. Along with cultivating music, Sieyes also enjoyed writing reflections concerning these pieces. Sieyès had a collection of musical pieces he called "la catalogue de ma petite musique".

Although Sieyès was passionate about his ideologies, he had a rather uninvolved social life. His journals and papers held much information about his studies but almost nothing pertaining to his personal life. His associates referred to him as cold and vain. In particular, Charles Maurice de Talleyrand-Périgord remarked that "Men are in his eyes chess-pieces to be moved, they occupy his mind but say nothing to his heart."

== Bibliography ==
- Essai sur les privilèges, 1788
- Qu'est-ce que le tiers état?, 1789
- Vues sur les moyens d'exécution dont les représentants de la France pourront disposer en 1789, 1789
- Préliminaire de la Constitution françoise. Reconnoissance et exposition raisonnée des droits de l'homme & du citoyen, 1789
- Dire de l'abbé Sieyès, sur la question du Veto royal, à la séance du 7 septembre 1789, 1789

== See also ==
- Les Neuf Sœurs, a Parisian Masonic lodge of which Sieyès was a member
