= Pierre Daunou =

French statesman, author, archivist and historian

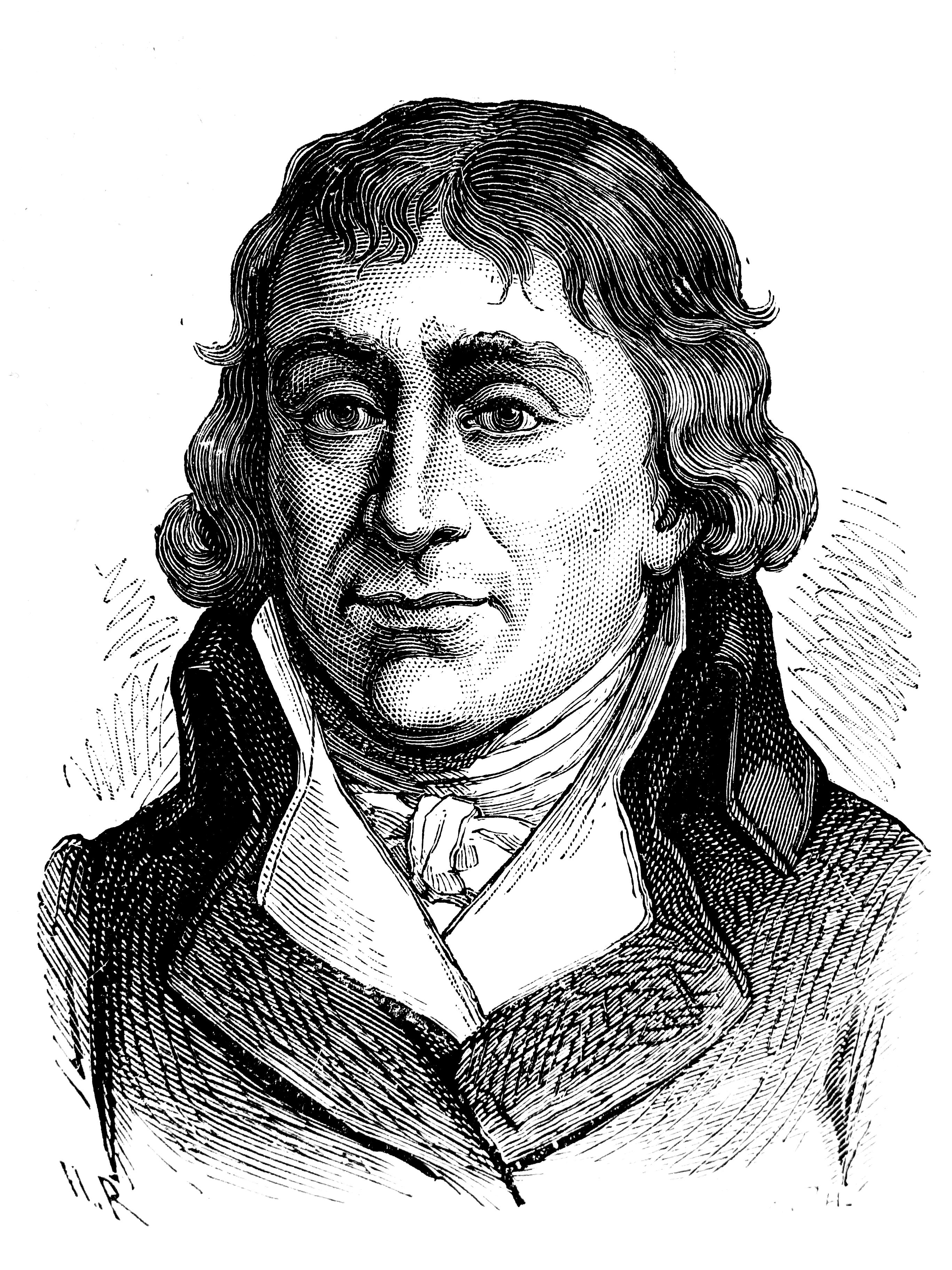
- Born: Pierre Claude François Daunou; 18 August 1761; Bordeaux, France
- Died: 20 June 1840 (aged 78)
- Known for: French statesman and historian

Pierre Claude François Daunou (French pronunciation: [pjɛʁ klod fʁɑ̃swa donu]; 18 August 1761 – 20 June 1840) was a French statesman of the French Revolution and Empire. An author and historian, he served as the nation's archivist under both the Empire and the Restoration, contributed a volume to the Histoire littéraire de la France, and published more than twenty volumes of lectures he delivered when he held the chair of history and ethics at the Collège de France.

== Early career ==
He was born at Boulogne-sur-Mer. After studying at the school the Oratorians operates there, he joined the order in Paris in 1777. He was professor in various seminaries from 1780 to 1787, when he was ordained a priest. He had by then published essays and poems that established his reputation in literary circles.

With the onset of the French Revolution, he supported the Civil Constitution of the Clergy; a proffered appointment to a high Catholic Church office failed to induce him to alter his position.

Elected to the National Convention by the Pas-de-Calais département, he associated himself with the moderate Girondists and strongly opposed the death sentence imposed on King Louis XVI. Daunou took little part in the Girondist clash with their radical opponents, The Mountain, but was involved in the events of his party's overthrow in the summer of 1793 and was imprisoned for almost a year.

== Directory ==
In December 1794 he returned to the convention and was the principal author of the Constitution of the Year III that established the Directory in November 1795. It is probably because of his Girondinism that the Council of the Ancients was given the right of convoking the Council of Five Hundred outside Paris, an expedient which made possible Napoleon Bonaparte's coup d'état (the 18 Brumaire) in 1799.

Daunou also drew up the plans for the erection and organization of the Institut de France. He was instrumental in crushing the Royalist insurgency known as the 13 Vendémiaire. He was elected by twenty-seven départements as member of the Council of Five Hundred and became its first president. He was ineligible for election as a director, having himself set the age qualification for that office at forty when he was thirty-four. When the government passed into the hands of Talleyrand and his associates, Daunou returned briefly to literature, but in 1798 he was sent to Rome to organize the Roman Republic.

== Napoleon and Restoration ==
In 1799, Daunou returned the role of statesman, preparing the Constitution of the Year VIII, which established the Consulate, under which Napoleon held the position of First Consul. He remained largely ambivalent towards Napoleon, but supported him against Pope Pius VII and the Papal States, providing him historical arguments in a scholarly treatise Sur la puissance temporelle du Pape (On the Temporal Power of the Papacy) in 1809.

Nonetheless, he took little part in the new regime, of which he was resentful, and turned more and more to literature. At the Restoration in 1814, he was deprived of the post of archivist of the Empire, which he had held since 1807. In 1819 he became the chair of history and ethics at the Collège de France; in that role, his courses were among the most famous of the period. With the advent of the July Monarchy in 1830, he regained his old post, now under the title archivist of the Kingdom. In 1839, Daunou was made a peer.

== Legacy ==
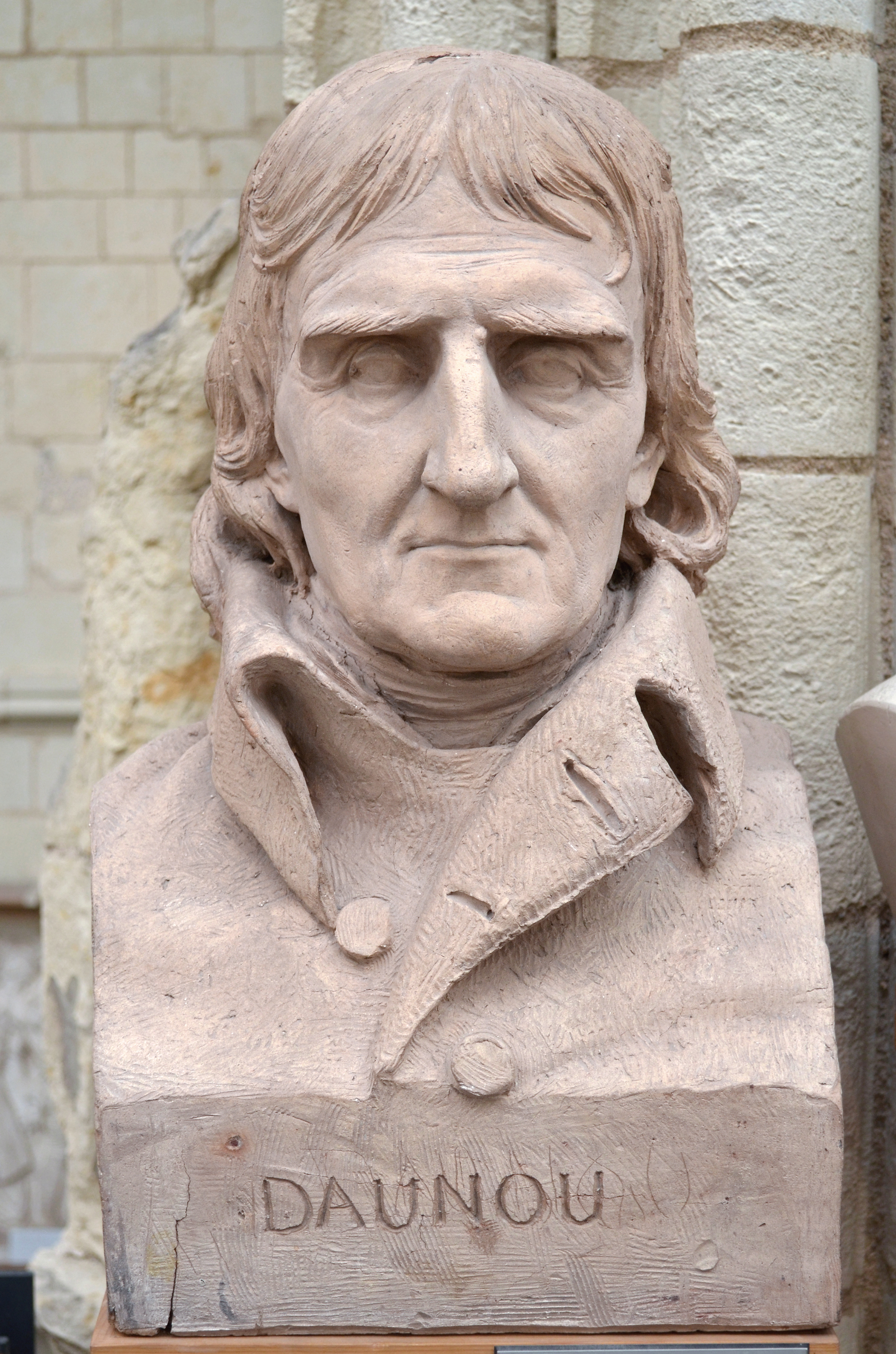
Bust of Pierre Daunou by David d'Angers (1840).

The Encyclopædia Britannica Eleventh Edition writes:

In politics Daunou was a Girondist without combativeness; a confirmed republican, who lent himself always to the policy of conciliation, but whose probity remained unchallenged. He belonged essentially to the centre, and lacked both the genius and the temperament which would secure for him a commanding place in a revolutionary era. As an historian his breadth of view is remarkable for his time; for although thoroughly imbued with the classical spirit of the 18th century, he was able to do justice to the middle ages. His Discours sur l'état des lettres au XIIIe siècle, in the sixteenth volume of the Histoire littéraire de France, is a remarkable contribution to that vast collection, especially as coming from an author so profoundly learned in the ancient classics. Daunou's lectures at the Collège de France, collected and published after his death, fill twenty volumes (Cours d'études historiques, 1842–1846). They deal principally with the criticism of sources and the proper method of writing history, and occupy an important place in the evolution of the scientific study of history in France. All his works were written in an elegant style; but apart from his share in the editing of the Historiens de la France, they were mostly in the form of separate articles on literary and historical subjects. In character, Daunou was reserved and somewhat austere, preserving in his habits a strange mixture of bourgeois and monk. His indefatigable work as archivist in the time when Napoleon was transferring so many treasures to Paris won him the gratitude of later scholars.

== See also ==
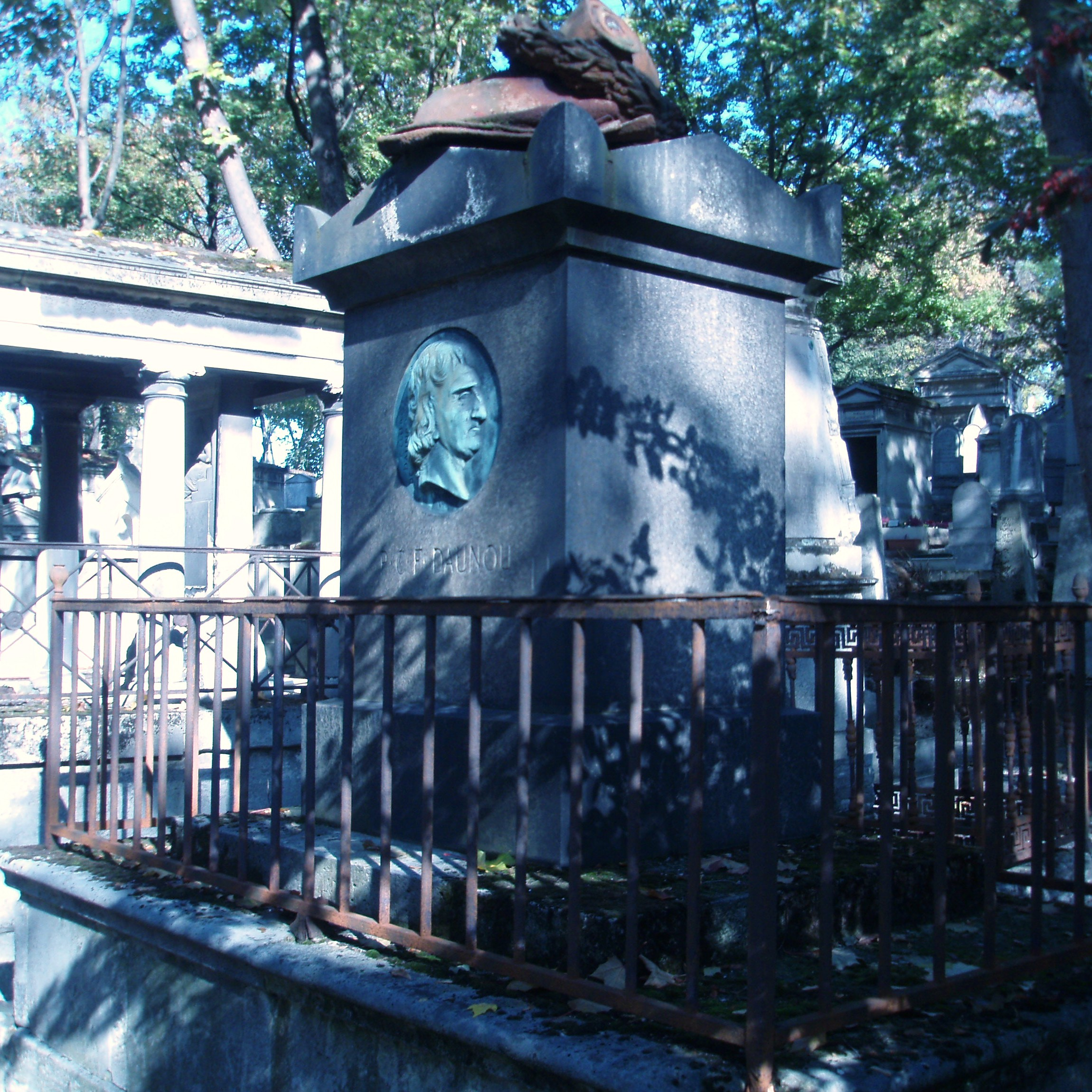
Tomb of Pierre Daunou

- Society of the Friends of Truth
