= Law of Hostages =

The Law of Hostages was a 1799 law enacted by the French Directory during the final stages of the French Revolution (July–October 1799) to strengthen its power in regions that the Directory viewed as problematic. The law allowed local authorities to draw up lists of "hostages", who would be held responsible for certain criminal offences, particularly targeting notables suspected of threatening the Directory's authority. Since local authorities were responsible for the law's execution, it was not always effective. Local authorities often sympathized with those it targeted or refrained from enforcement to avoid strife in their community.

The law was repealed in November 1799, after Napoleon Bonaparte seized power in the Coup of 18 Brumaire.

== See also ==
- Law of Suspects
