= Roger Ducos =

French revolutionary (1747–1816)

Pierre Roger Ducos
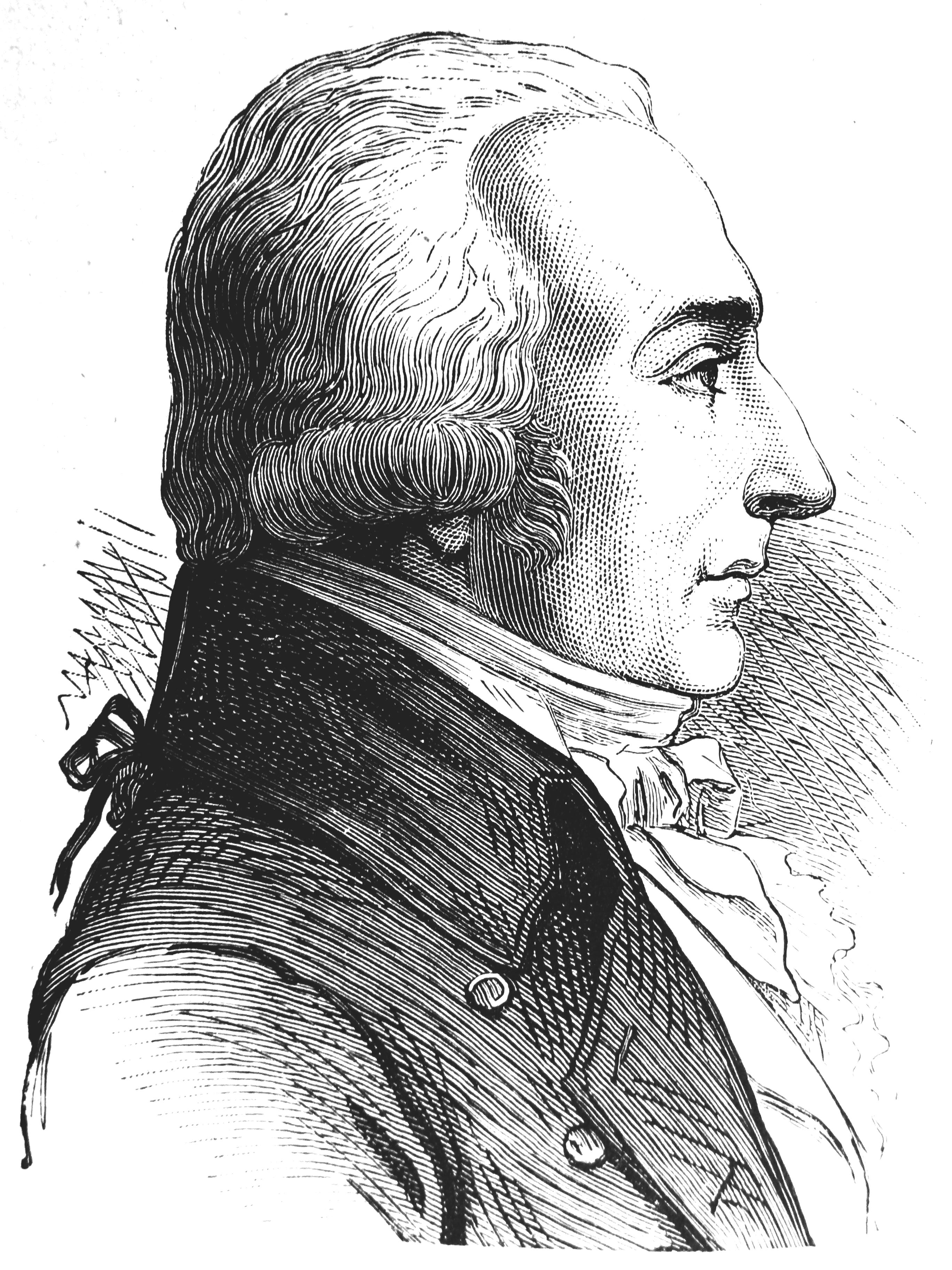

Provisional Consul of France
- In office 10 November 1799 – 12 December 1799 Serving with Napoléon Bonaparte and Emmanuel Joseph Sieyès
- Preceded by: Office established
- Succeeded by: Charles-François Lebrun (as Third Consul)

Member of the Directory
- In office 18 June 1799 – 9 November 1799
- Preceded by: Louis Marie de La Révellière-Lépeaux
- Succeeded by: Office abolished

Personal details
- Born: 25 July 1747 Montfort-en-Chalosse, Aquitaine, Kingdom of France
- Died: 16 March 1816 (aged 68) Ulm, German Confederation

Pierre Roger Ducos (25 July 1747 – 16 March 1816), better known as Roger Ducos, was a French political figure during the Revolution and First Empire, a member of the National Convention, and of the Directory.

== In the Revolution ==
Born in Montfort-en-Chalosse, Aquitaine (now in Landes department), he was elected deputy to the convention by the département of the Landes. He sat in The Plain (the party which had no clear attitude, and served to sway the vote). He voted for the death of King Louis XVI, without appeal or delay, but was not prominent in the Convention afterwards.

Ducos was a member of the Council of Five Hundred, over which he presided on the 18th of Fructidor Coup (1797). At the end of his term, he became a justice of the peace, but after Barthélemy Catherine Joubert's coup d'état (the 30 Prairial of the year VIII, or 18 June 1799), he was named a member of the executive Directory, thanks to the influence of Paul Barras, who counted on Ducos as his partisan.

== Consulate, Empire, and exile ==
On 9 November 1799, Ducos accepted the coup d'état of Napoleon Bonaparte (the 18 Brumaire), and was one of the three Provisional Consuls (with Napoleon and Emmanuel-Joseph Sieyès), becoming vice-president of the Senate with the arrival of a stable Consulate formula. He was many times honored under the Empire, but in 1814 he abandoned Napoleon, and voted for his deposition.

He sought to gain the favor of the government of the Restoration, but in 1816 was exiled on the basis of the law regarding the regicides. He died in March 1816 near Ulm, from a carriage accident.
