= 1800 French constitutional referendum =

Referendum in France in 1800

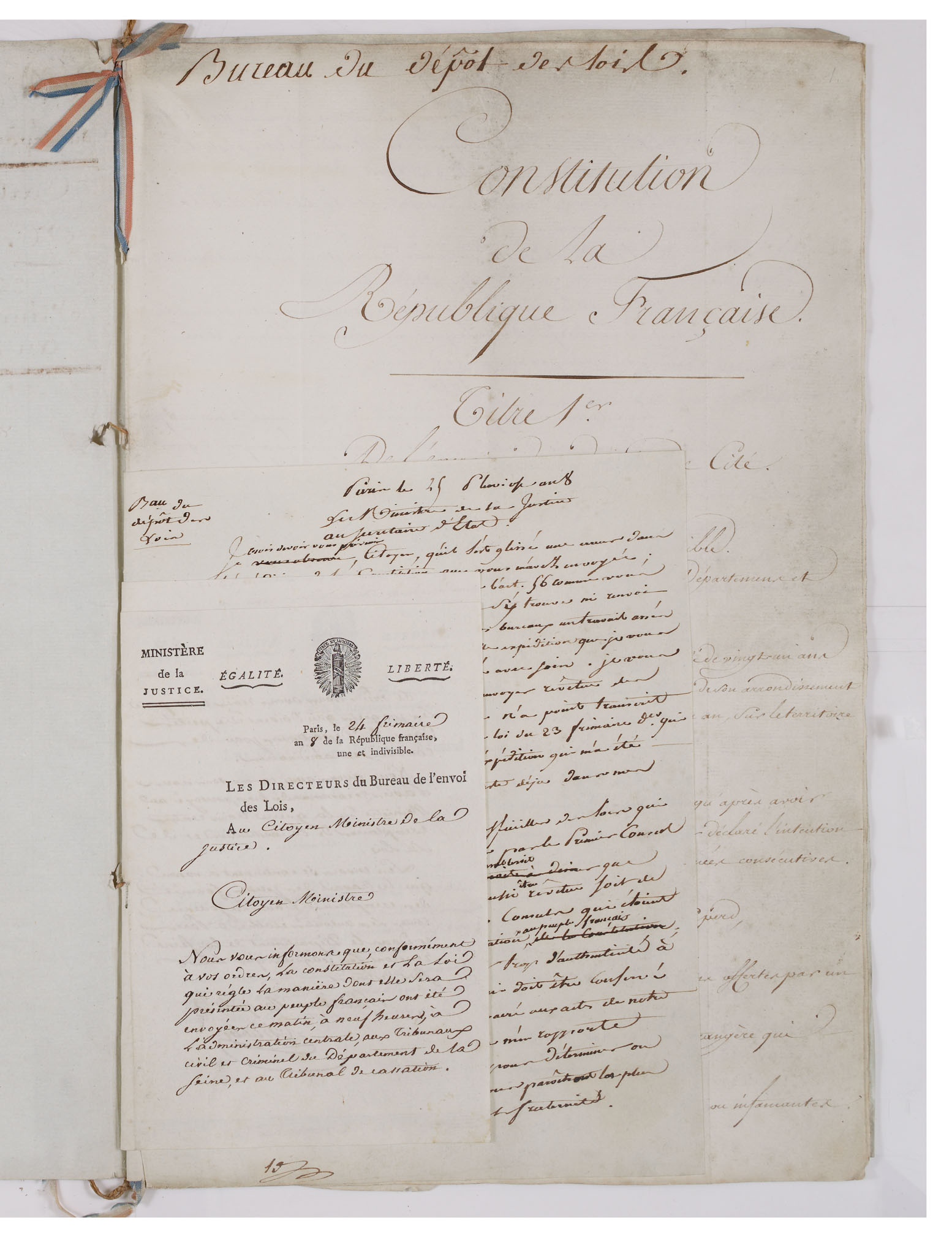
First page of the Constitution of the Year VIII

A referendum ratifying the constitution of the French consulate was held in February 1800. The official results, as announced by Lucien Bonaparte, Minister of the Interior and brother of First Consul Napoleon Bonaparte, were 99.9% in favor of the new constitution, with 53.74% of voters abstaining. However, evidence brought to light by the French historian Claude Langlois in 1972 demonstrated conclusively that Lucien massaged the votes in favor of the constitution, adding up to 20,000 "yes" votes in individual localities, and that there were therefore only some 1,550,000 actual votes for the change.

== Results ==
French voters approved the French Constitution of 1800 with an official result of 99.94%.

1800 French Constitutional Referendum
Choice	Votes	%
For	3,011,007	99.95
Against	1,562	0.05
Total	3,012,569	100.00
Source: Alexander, Ellis

1800 French Constitutional Referendum results (excluding invalid votes)
Yes; 3,011,007 (99.9%)
▲50%
