= Coup of 18 Brumaire =

1799 coup in Revolutionary France that brought Napoleon to power

Coup d'état of 18th Brumaire
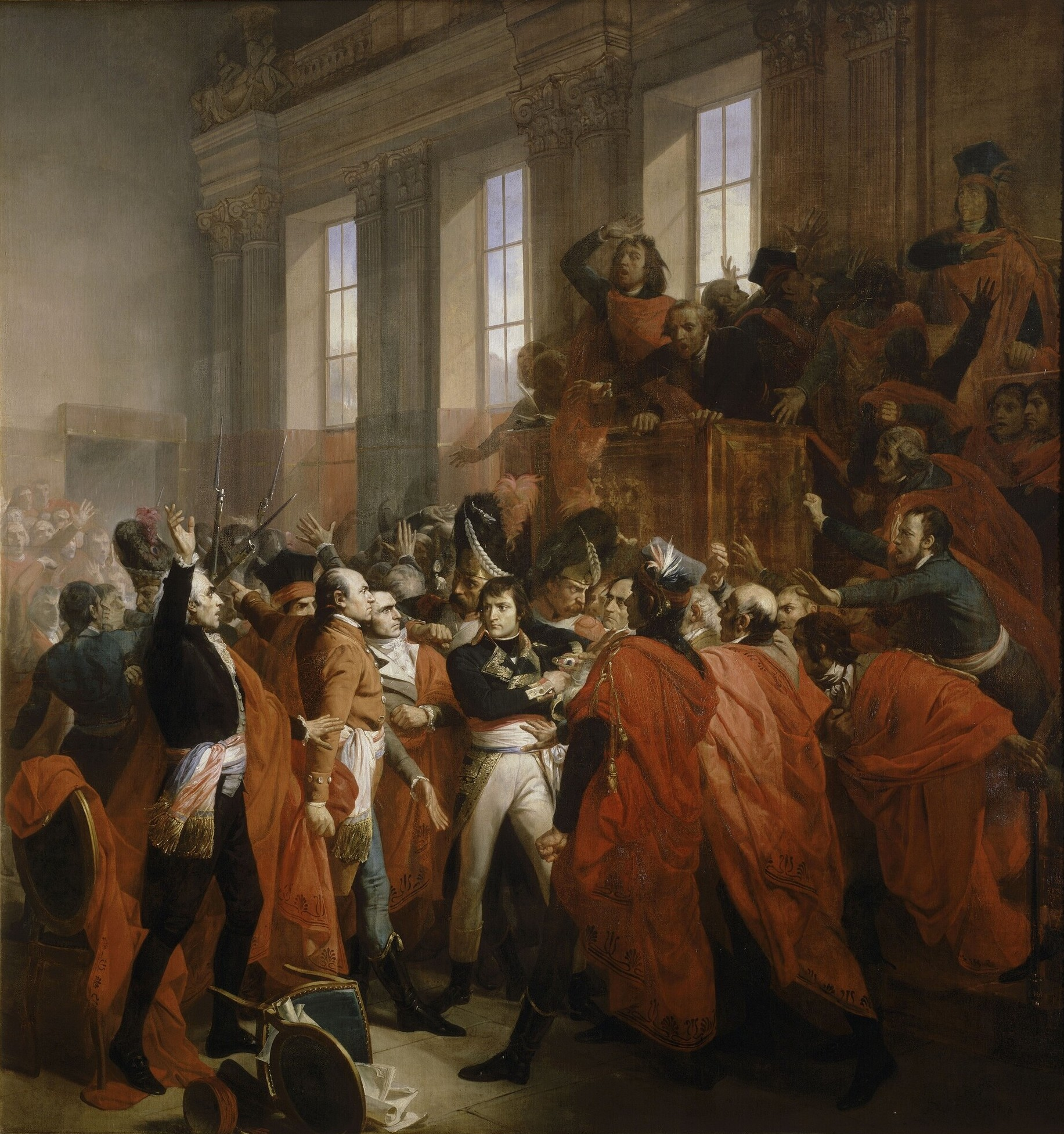
- Bonaparte at the Council of Five Hundred at Saint-Cloud by François Bouchot, 1840
- Date: 9 November 1799
- Location: Château de Saint-Cloud
- Participants: Napoleon Bonaparte; Emmanuel Joseph Sieyès; Charles-Maurice Talleyrand; Roger Ducos; Paul Barras; Lucien Bonaparte; Joseph Bonaparte; Jean Jacques Régis de Cambacérès; Charles François Lebrun; Joachim Murat; Others
- Outcome: Coup successful; Consulate established; Adoption of a constitution under which the First Consul, a position Bonaparte was to hold, had the most power in the French government

The Coup of 18 Brumaire (French: Coup d'État du 18 Brumaire) brought Napoleon Bonaparte to power as First Consul of the French First Republic. In the view of most historians, it ended the French Revolution and would soon lead to the coronation of Napoleon as Emperor of the French. This bloodless coup d'état overthrew the Directory, replacing it with the French Consulate. This occurred on 9 November 1799, which was 18 Brumaire, Year VIII, under the short-lived French Republican calendar system.

== Context ==
The French Republic, under the leadership of the Directory, had been at war with the major European powers since 1792. The introduction of a new tax system, which was perceived as unfair, and rising prices due to poor harvests meant that the Directory lost the support of the population. In May 1799, Emmanuel Joseph Sieyès had been elected to the Directory, where he steadily consolidated his power. As a staunch opponent of the Constitution of 1795, which granted the Directory only limited powers and no parliamentary control, he saw a coup d’état as the only way to achieve his goals.

Sieyès was looking for a sword – a strong man who would help restore the Republic in accordance with his vision, without pursuing his own political ambitions. Sieyès therefore did not initially have Napoleon in mind, but rather General Joubert. As Joubert was a political unknown, he hoped to be able to control him more easily. However, when Joubert fell at the Battle of Novi in August 1799, he turned to Napoleon, having been advised to do so by General Moreau.

== Prelude ==
Napoleon had arrived in Paris on 16 October. The reception he received from the Directory was lukewarm. Although Bernadotte’s proposal for a court-martial was rejected, the general atmosphere remained aloof. Between 19 and 20 October, Charles-Maurice de Talleyrand, Pierre-Louis Roederer, Hugues-Bernard Maret, Boulay de la Meurthe and Étienne Eustache Bruix approached Napoleon in an attempt to win him over to their cause. Napoleon kept a cautious stance but held exploratory talks with the Directory. His first attempt was directed at Louis-Jérôme Gohier. Bonaparte had originally intended to join the Directory himself. Although Gohier was friendly, he pointed out the constitutional hurdle: the minimum age for directors was 40, which Napoleon had not yet reached.

Influenced by his wife Joséphine, Napoleon subsequently turned to Paul Barras. Barras, however, saw the general as a dangerous rival and attempted to remove him from Paris by offering him a new command. Napoleon declined this on the pretext of health problems. On 4 November, Napoleon finally confronted Barras and asked him bluntly about his stance on a coup d’état. When Barras refused to offer any support, Napoleon was forced to form an alliance with his rival, Sieyès. From then on, the detailed planning took place on the Rue de la Victoire. The innermost circle, who were aware of the full extent of the plot, consisted solely of: Napoleon Bonaparte, Emmanuel Joseph Sieyès, Charles-Maurice de Talleyrand, Joseph Fouché and Roger Ducos. On 6 November, Sieyès and Napoleon settled their differences. They agreed that, following the coup, a commission should draft a new constitution. The coup was originally planned for 7 November. However, as some of the conspirators were hesitant and Napoleon was also superstitious about Fridays, he postponed the operation by 24 hours to Saturday, 9 November.

== Course of events ==
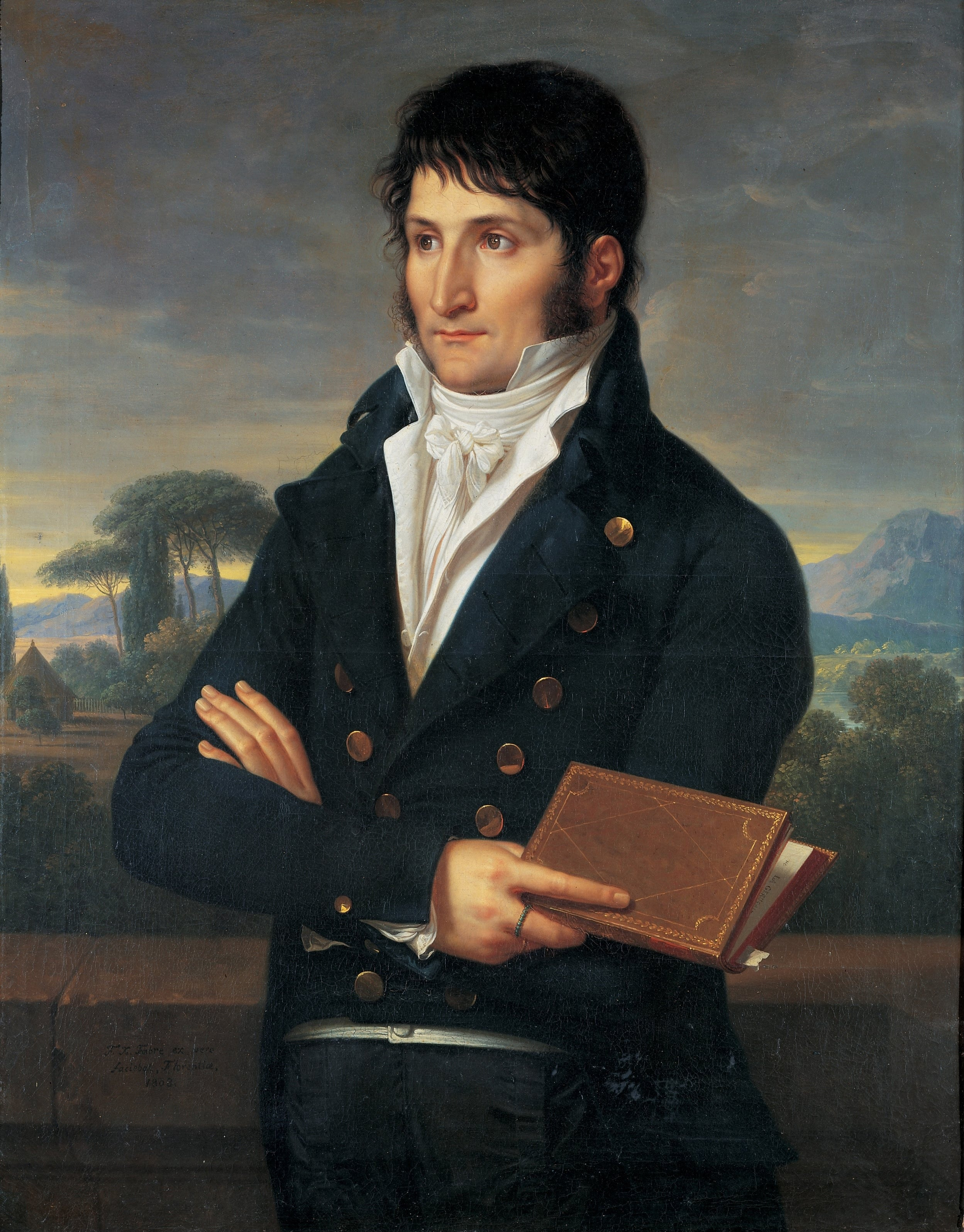
Lucien Bonaparte, president of the Council of Five Hundred, who engineered the coup that brought his brother to power. Lucien Bonaparte at the Villa Rufinella by Francois-Xavier Fabre, 1808

On 9 November, Napoleon rose at 5.00 am and began to carry out the actual coup d’état. On his orders, all members of the Council of Elders (in which Sieyès had a majority of supporters) were summoned to an urgent meeting at the Tuileries to discuss a matter of national importance. At 6.00 am, Colonel Horace-François Sébastiani, as planned, set off for the Tuileries accompanied by four hundred dragoons. At 6.30 am, Murat, Lannes, Berthier, Moreau, MacDonald and Lefebvre arrived in the Rue de la Victoire, having responded to the urgent summons. Bernadotte, whom Napoleon did not trust, was persuaded to remain neutral. To distract Gohier, he was invited to breakfast by Josephine at 8.00 am. Gohier, suspecting an ambush, sent his wife in his place.

In the meantime, the Council of Elders had been assembled. To keep out those members from whom resistance was feared, it was agreed that they should not receive their summons until a later date. Under the pretext that a Jacobin coup was imminent, Sieyès persuaded the Council of Elders to pass a decree relocating the National Assembly to the Château de Saint-Cloud, outside Paris. It was stipulated that no further sittings or deliberations were to take place until 12 noon on 10 November. Napoleon was entrusted with the implementation of this decree; furthermore, he was responsible for the security of the assemblies and was required to appear before the Council to take his oath.

At 8.30 am, Napoleon made his way to the Tuileries. There, he was appointed Commander-in-Chief of all troops in the Paris area. At around 11.00 am, the Council of Five Hundred was informed. Meanwhile, Gohier and Jean Moulin were on their way to the Tuileries. There they were told that Sieyès, Ducos and Barras had resigned (in fact, it was only Sieyès and Ducos) and that the Directory therefore no longer existed. When they refused to resign, Napoleon ordered that they be placed under house arrest. At the same time, Talleyrand informed Barras that the Directory had been dissolved. Talleyrand explained to him: it was obvious that Bonaparte had taken command solely because the Republic was in danger, and under these circumstances, Barras would certainly raise no objections to his resignation. Taken by surprise by this veiled threat, Barras signed his resignation without comment.

Sieyès’ plan envisaged that the Council of Elders would meet in the Hall of Apollo, whilst the Council of Five Hundred would take up residence in the Orangery. Due to delays (Saint-Cloud had stood empty since 1790 and therefore had to be prepared to accommodate both chambers), the members of the Council of Elders and the Council of Five Hundred mingled freely; precisely the situation that Sieyès had hoped to avoid. To prevent a violent uprising by the deputies, Napoleon had the palace surrounded by 6,000 soldiers. The meeting of the Council of Elders began an hour late, at 1.00 pm on November 10. A confrontation immediately broke out between Sieyès’s supporters and those members who had deliberately not been summoned the previous day. When the appointment of a new Directory was proposed, Napoleon stormed into the chamber and interrupted the debate. The deputies reacted with loud protests. They demanded that Bonaparte provide evidence for his claims of a conspiracy. Words such as ‘tyrant’ and ‘dictator’ were heard. Bonaparte appeared uncertain and delivered a rambling speech. He threatened that his soldiers would obey him and not the deputies. Finally, Louis-Antoine Fauvelet de Bourrienne intervened. He pulled Bonaparte by his coat and urged him to leave the chamber immediately.

At 4.00 pm, Napoleon entered the Orangery, where the Council of Five Hundred was in session. Neither Sieyès nor Napoleon had a majority there. As there were already doubts about the legality of Barras’s resignation, Napoleon’s appearance in full uniform and the sight of the troops visible through the open door sparked discontent and protest amongst the deputies. Shouts such as ‘Get out of here!’ or ‘Kill him!’ could be heard, whilst others climbed over benches and chairs in an attempt to seize him. It was only thanks to the swift reaction of Murat and Lefebvre that the dazed and bleeding Napoleon was saved. A purely parliamentary takeover was now out of the question. Lucien Bonaparte seized the initiative by addressing the guards, claiming that Napoleon had been attacked. After some hesitation, the chamber was forcibly cleared. By 2.00 am, Lucien had gathered a quorum of stragglers from the Five Hundred and fifty members of the Council of Elders, who officially dissolved the Directory and swore an oath of allegiance to a triumvirate of provisional consuls: Napoleon, Sieyès and Ducos. The Legislative was adjourned, and two commissions were tasked with drafting a new constitution within six weeks.

== Aftermath ==
Following the successful takeover, Napoleon’s top priority was to isolate Sieyès politically. After weeks of fruitless discussions about the new constitution drafted by Sieyès, he finally resigned after Napoleon had publicly criticised his ideas. Napoleon adopted the main features of Sieyès’s draft and established four assemblies – the Corps législatif comprising 300 deputies, a Senate of sixty, a Tribunate of one hundred, and a Council of State with around thirty to forty members. In this way, Napoleon ensured that all four chambers could block one another’s actions; the ministers were accountable only to the Consul. On 12 December, the constitution was finally adopted. To prevent resistance, Napoleon appointed Jean-Jacques Cambacérés and Charles Lebrun as co-consuls, who represented the interests of the Jacobins and the Royalists respectively, thereby establishing a balance between the two major political factions.

To avoid any appearance of a restoration of the monarchy and the divine right of kings, Napoleon put the constitution to a referendum: 3,011,007 votes in favour versus 1,562 against. Half a million votes had been cast by the army without valid ballot papers, whilst in the rest of the country votes at public meetings were recorded solely by a show of hands. This accounted for around half of the ‘yes’ votes cast. Added to this were some 900,000 votes forged by Lucien Bonaparte. With a turnout of just 25 per cent (6 million French people did not take part in the vote) and after deducting all invalid votes, Napoleon had secured only 17 per cent of the actual votes.

== Bibliography ==
- Woronoff, Denis (1984). The Thermidorean Regime and the Directory, 1794-1799. Cambridge: Cambridge University Press.
- Castelot, Andre (1971). Napoleon. New York: Harper & Row.
- Harvey, Robert (2006). The War of Wars : the Great European Conflict, 1793-1815. New York: Carroll & Graf. ISBN 0-7867-1857-9.
- Roberts, Andrew (2014). Napoleon: A Life. New York: Viking. ISBN 978-0-698-17628-7.
- Horn, Jeff (2002). "Building the New Regime: Founding the Bonapartist State in the Department of the Aube". French Historical Studies. 25 (2). Duke University Press. doi:10.1215/00161071-25-2-225.
- Doyle, William (1989). The Oxford History of the French Revolution. Oxford: Oxford University Press. ISBN 0-19-285221-3.
- Kircheisen, Friedrich Max (1972). Napoleon. Freeport: Books for Libraries Press.
- McLynn, Frank (1997). Napoleon. London: Jonathan Cape. ISBN 0-224-04072-3.
