= List of presidents of the Senate of France =

President of the French Senate
- Président du Sénat français (French)
- Logo of the French Senate

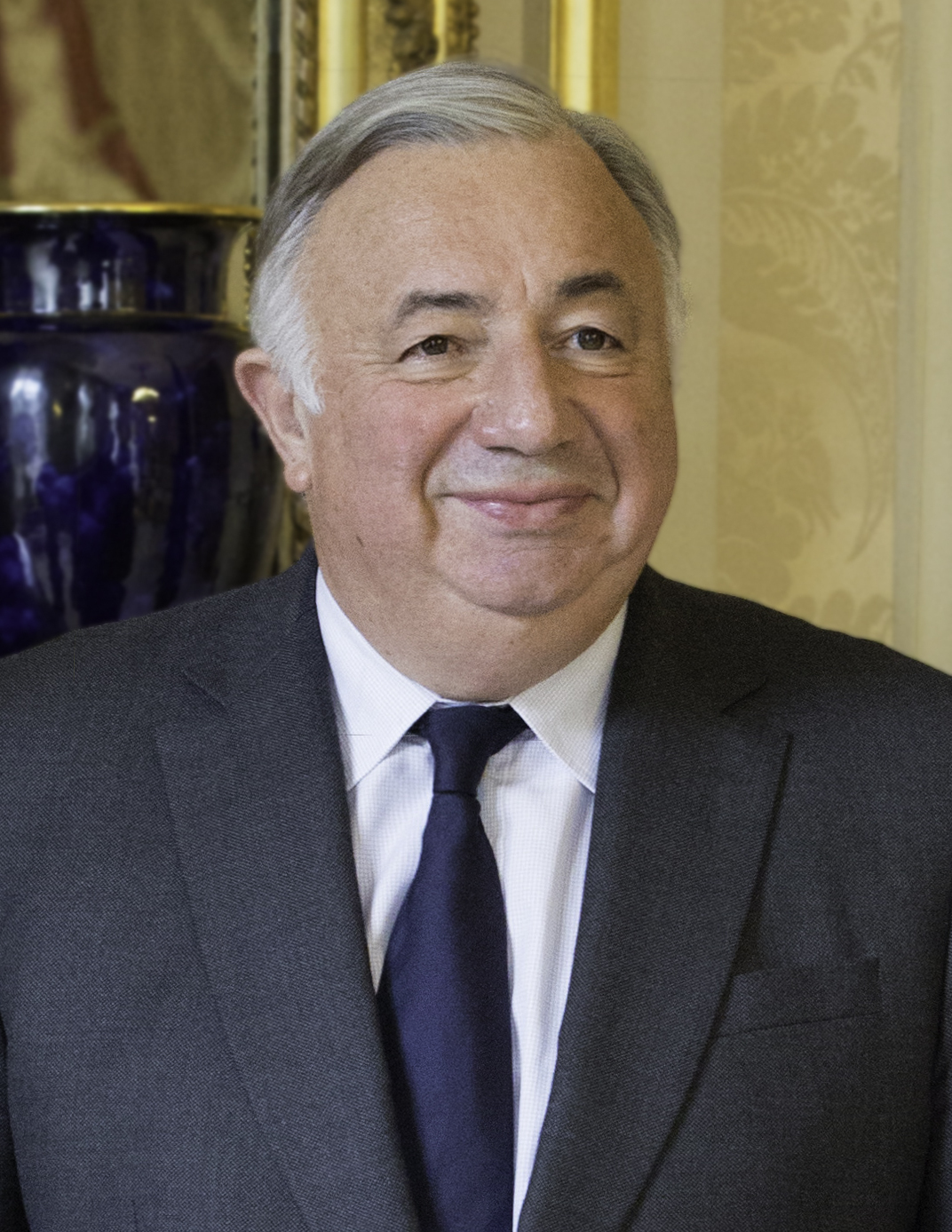
- Incumbent; Gérard Larcher since 1 October 2014
- Senate of France
- Type: Presiding officer
- Member of: French Parliament
- Residence: Petit Luxembourg
- Term length: 3 years, renewable
- Formation: 28 October 1795
- First holder: Claude-Antoine Rudel
- Succession: 1st
- Website: Official website

This article lists the presidents of the Senate of France (French: Président du Sénat français; official translation: Speaker of the Senate) and assimilated chambers.

The Senate is the upper house of the French Parliament. It is presided over by a president. Although there had been Senates in both the First and Second Empires, these had not technically been legislative bodies, but rather advisory bodies on the model of the Roman Senate. France's first experience with an upper house was under the Directory from 1795 to 1799, when the Council of Ancients was the upper chamber. With the Restoration in 1814, a new Chamber of Peers was created, on the model of the British House of Lords. At first it contained hereditary peers, but following the July Revolution of 1830, it became a body to which one was appointed for life. The Second Republic returned to a unicameral system after 1848, but soon after the establishment of the Second Empire in 1852, a Senate was established as the upper chamber. In the Fourth Republic, the Senate was renamed the Council of the Republic, but its function was largely the same. With the new constitution of the Fifth Republic in 1959, the older name of Senate was restored.

== Acting President of the French Republic ==
The president of the Senate, in addition to his duties as presiding officer of the upper house of parliament, is also, according to the Constitution of the Fifth Republic, first in line of succession in case of death, resignation, or removal by impeachment of the president, thus becoming Acting President of the Republic until a new election can be held. This has already occurred twice. Alain Poher, the president of the French Senate, served as Acting President of France from 28 April until 20 June 1969 (between the resignation of President Charles de Gaulle and the installation of his elected successor President Georges Pompidou) and again from 3 April until 27 May 1974 (between the death of President Georges Pompidou and the installation of his elected successor President Valéry Giscard d'Estaing).

== List of officeholders ==
=== Under the Directory (1795–1799) ===
Presidents of the Council of Ancients:

| Portrait | Name | Took office | Left office |
|---|---|---|---|
| | Claude-Antoine Rudel | 28 October 1795 | |
| | Louis Marie de La Révellière-Lépeaux | 28 October 1795 | 2 November 1795 |
| | Pierre-Charles-Louis Baudin | 2 November 1795 | 23 November 1795 |
| | François Denis Tronchet | 23 November 1795 | 22 December 1795 |
| | Théodore Vernier | 22 December 1795 | 22 January 1796 |
| | Guillaume François Charles Goupil de Préfelne | 22 January 1796 | 20 February 1796 |
| | Claude Ambroise Régnier | 20 February 1796 | 21 March 1796 |
| | Jacques Antoine Creuzé-Latouche | 21 March 1796 | 20 April 1796 |
| | Jean-Barthélémy Le Couteulx de Canteleu | 20 April 1796 | 20 May 1796 |
| | Charles-François Lebrun | 20 May 1796 | 19 June 1796 |
| | Jean-Étienne-Marie Portalis | 19 June 1796 | 19 July 1796 |
| | Jean Dussaulx | 19 July 1796 | 18 August 1796 |
| | Honoré Muraire | 18 August 1796 | 23 September 1796 |
| | Roger Ducos | 23 September 1796 | 22 October 1796 |
| | Jean-Gérard Lacuée, count of Cessac | 22 October 1796 | 21 November 1796 |
| | Jean-Jacques Bréard | 21 November 1796 | 21 December 1796 |
| | Boniface Paradis | 21 December 1796 | 20 January 1797 |
| | Sébastien Ligeret de Beauvais | 20 January 1797 | 19 February 1797 |
| | Joseph Clément Poullain de Grandprey | 19 February 1797 | 21 March 1797 |
| | Jean-François-Bertrand Delmas | 21 March 1797 | 20 April 1797 |
| | Edme-Bonaventure Courtois | 20 April 1797 | 20 May 1797 |
| | François Barbé-Marbois | 20 May 1797 | 19 June 1797 |
| | Louis Bernard de Saint-Affrique | 19 June 1797 | 19 July 1797 |
| | Pierre Samuel du Pont de Nemours | 19 July 1797 | 18 August 1797 |
| | André-Daniel Laffon de Ladebat | 18 August 1797 | 4 September 1797 |
| | Jean-Antoine Marbot | 6 September 1797 | 23 September 1797 |
| | Emmanuel Crétet | 23 September 1797 | 22 October 1797 |
| | Jean-Pierre Lacombe-Saint-Michel | 22 October 1797 | 21 November 1797 |
| | Jean François Philibert Rossée | 21 November 1797 | 21 December 1797 |
| | Jean-Baptiste Marragon | 21 December 1797 | 20 January 1798 |
| | Jean Rousseau | 20 January 1798 | 19 February 1798 |
| | Pardoux Bordas | 19 February 1798 | 21 March 1798 |
| | Étienne Mollevaut | 21 March 1798 | 20 April 1798 |
| | Jacques Poisson de Coudreville | 20 April 1798 | 20 May 1798 |
| | Claude Ambroise Régnier | 20 May 1798 | 19 June 1798 |
| | Jean-Antoine Marbot | 19 June 1798 | 19 July 1798 |
| | Étienne Maynaud de Bizefranc de Laveaux | 19 July 1798 | 18 August 1798 |
| | Pierre Antoine Laloy | 18 August 1798 | 23 September 1798 |
| | Benoît Michel Decomberousse | 23 September 1798 | 22 October 1798 |
| | Emmanuel Pérès de Lagesse | 22 October 1798 | 21 November 1798 |
| | Jean-Augustin Moreau de Vormes | 21 November 1798 | 21 December 1798 |
| | Jean-Baptiste Perrin des Vosges | 21 December 1798 | 20 January 1799 |
| | Dominique Joseph Garat | 20 January 1799 | 19 February 1799 |
| | Jean-Aimé Delacoste | 19 February 1799 | 21 March 1799 |
| | Mathieu Depère | 21 March 1799 | 20 April 1799 |
| | Claude-Pierre de Delay d'Agier | 20 April 1799 | 20 May 1799 |
| | Charles Claude Christophe Gourdan | 20 May 1799 | 19 June 1799 |
| | Pierre-Charles-Louis Baudin | 19 June 1799 | 19 July 1799 |
| | Louis Dubois du Bais | 19 July 1799 | 18 August 1799 |
| | Mathieu-Augustin Cornet | 18 August 1799 | 24 September 1799 |
| | Joseph Cornudet des Chaumettes | 24 September 1799 | 23 October 1799 |
| | Louis-Nicolas Lemercier | 23 October 1799 | 10 November 1799 |

=== Under the Consulate (1799–1804) ===
Presidents of the Sénat conservateur:

| Portrait | Name | Took office | Left office |
|---|---|---|---|
| | Emmanuel-Joseph Sieyès | 27 December 1799 | 13 February 1800 |
| | François Barthélemy | 13 February 1800 | 27 February 1801 |
| | François Denis Tronchet | 27 February 1801 | 2 August 1801 |
| | François Christophe Kellermann | 2 August 1801 | 18 January 1802 |
| | Louis-Nicolas Lemercier | 18 January 1802 | 4 August 1802 |

=== Under the First Empire (1804–1814) ===
Presidents of the Sénat conservateur:

| Portrait | Name | Took office | Left office |
|---|---|---|---|
| | François de Neufchâteau | 19 May 1804 | 19 May 1806 |
| | Gaspard Monge | 19 May 1806 | 1 July 1807 |
| | Bernard Germain de Lacépède | 1 July 1807 | 1 July 1808 |
| | Jean-Denis-René de Saint-Vallier | 1 July 1808 | 1 July 1809 |
| | Germain Garnier | 1 July 1809 | 1 July 1811 |
| | Bernard Germain de Lacépède | 1 July 1811 | 1 July 1813 |
| | François Barthélemy | 1 July 1813 | 1 July 1814 |

=== Under the Bourbon Restoration (1814–1830) ===
Presidents of the Chamber of Peers:

| Portrait | Name | Took office | Left office |
|---|---|---|---|
| | Charles-Henri, chevalier Dambray | 4 June 1814 | 20 March 1815 |
| | Jean Jacques Régis de Cambacérès | 2 June 1815 | 7 July 1815 |
| | Charles-Henri, chevalier Dambray | 12 October 1815 | 12 December 1829 |
| | Claude-Emmanuel, marquis de Pastoret | 17 December 1829 | 3 August 1830 |

=== Under the July Monarchy (1830–1848) ===
Presidents of the Chamber of Peers:

| Portrait | Name | Took office | Left office |
|---|---|---|---|
| | Étienne-Denis Pasquier | 3 August 1830 | 24 February 1848 |

=== Under the Second Empire (1852–1870) ===
Presidents of the Senate:

| Portrait | Name | Took office | Left office | Political party |
|---|---|---|---|---|
| | Jérôme Bonaparte | 28 January 1852 | 30 November 1852 | Bonapartist |
| | Raymond-Theodore Troplong | 30 December 1852 | 1 March 1869 | Bonapartist |
| | Adrien Marie Devienne | 3 March 1869 | 20 July 1869 | Bonapartist |
| | Eugène Rouher | 20 July 1869 | 4 September 1870 | Bonapartist |

=== Under the Third Republic (1870–1940) ===
Presidents of the Senate:

| Portrait | Name | Took office | Left office | Political party |
|---|---|---|---|---|
| | Gaston Audiffret-Pasquier | 13 March 1876 | 15 January 1879 | Conservative |
| | Louis Martel | 15 January 1879 | 25 May 1880 | Conservative |
| | Léon Say | 25 May 1880 | 2 February 1882 | Republican |
| | Philippe Le Royer | 2 February 1882 | 24 February 1893 | Republican |
| | Jules Ferry | 24 February 1893 | 17 March 1893 | Left Republican |
| | Paul-Armand Challemel-Lacour | 27 March 1893 | 16 January 1896 | Opportunist Republican |
| | Émile Loubet | 16 January 1896 | 18 February 1899 | Left Republican |
| | Armand Fallières | 3 March 1899 | 17 January 1906 | Democratic Republican Alliance |
| | Antonin Dubost | 16 February 1906 | 14 January 1920 | Democratic Republican Alliance |
| | Léon Bourgeois | 14 January 1920 | 22 February 1923 | Radical |
| | Gaston Doumergue | 22 February 1923 | 13 June 1924 | Radical |
| | Justin de Selves | 19 June 1924 | 9 January 1927 | Radical |
| | Paul Doumer | 14 January 1927 | 13 May 1931 | Radical |
| | Albert Lebrun | 11 June 1931 | 10 May 1932 | Democratic Alliance |
| | Jules Jeanneney | 3 June 1932 | 9 July 1940 | Radical |

=== Under the Fourth Republic (1946–1958) ===
Presidents of the Council of the Republic:

Political party
MRP Radical

| Portrait | Name | Took office | Left office | Political party |
|---|---|---|---|---|
| | Auguste Champetier de Ribes | 27 December 1946 | 6 March 1947 | MRP |
| | Gaston Monnerville | 18 March 1947 | 2 October 1958 | Radical |

=== Under the Fifth Republic (1958–present) ===
Presidents of the Senate:

Political party
Radical CD; CDS; FD RPR; UMP; LR PS

| Portrait | Name | Took office | Left office | Political party |
|---|---|---|---|---|
| | Gaston Monnerville | 9 December 1958 | 2 October 1968 | Radical |
| | Alain Poher | 3 October 1968 | 1 October 1992 | CD (until 1976); CDS (from 1976; within the UDF from 1978) |
| | René Monory | 2 October 1992 | 1 October 1998 | CDS (until 1995); FD (from 1995; within the UDF) |
| | Christian Poncelet | 2 October 1998 | 30 September 2008 | RPR (until 2002); UMP (from 2002) |
| | Gérard Larcher | 1 October 2008 | 30 September 2011 | UMP |
| | Jean-Pierre Bel | 1 October 2011 | 30 September 2014 | PS |
| | Gérard Larcher | 1 October 2014 | Incumbent | UMP (until 2015); LR (since 2015) |

== See also ==
- Senate (France)
- Council of Ancients (France)
- Council of the Republic (France)
- Chamber of Peers (France)
- President of the Senate (France)
