= Joseph Siméon =

Joseph Siméon may refer to:

- Joseph Jérôme Siméon, French jurist and politician
- Joseph Balthazard Siméon, his son, French politician and diplomat
