= Portalis =

Portalis is a surname. Notable people with the surname include:

- Jean-Étienne-Marie Portalis (1746–1807), French jurist and politician
- Joseph-Marie, comte Portalis (1778–1858), French diplomat and statesman
