= Emmanuel Crétet =

French banker and politician (1747–1809

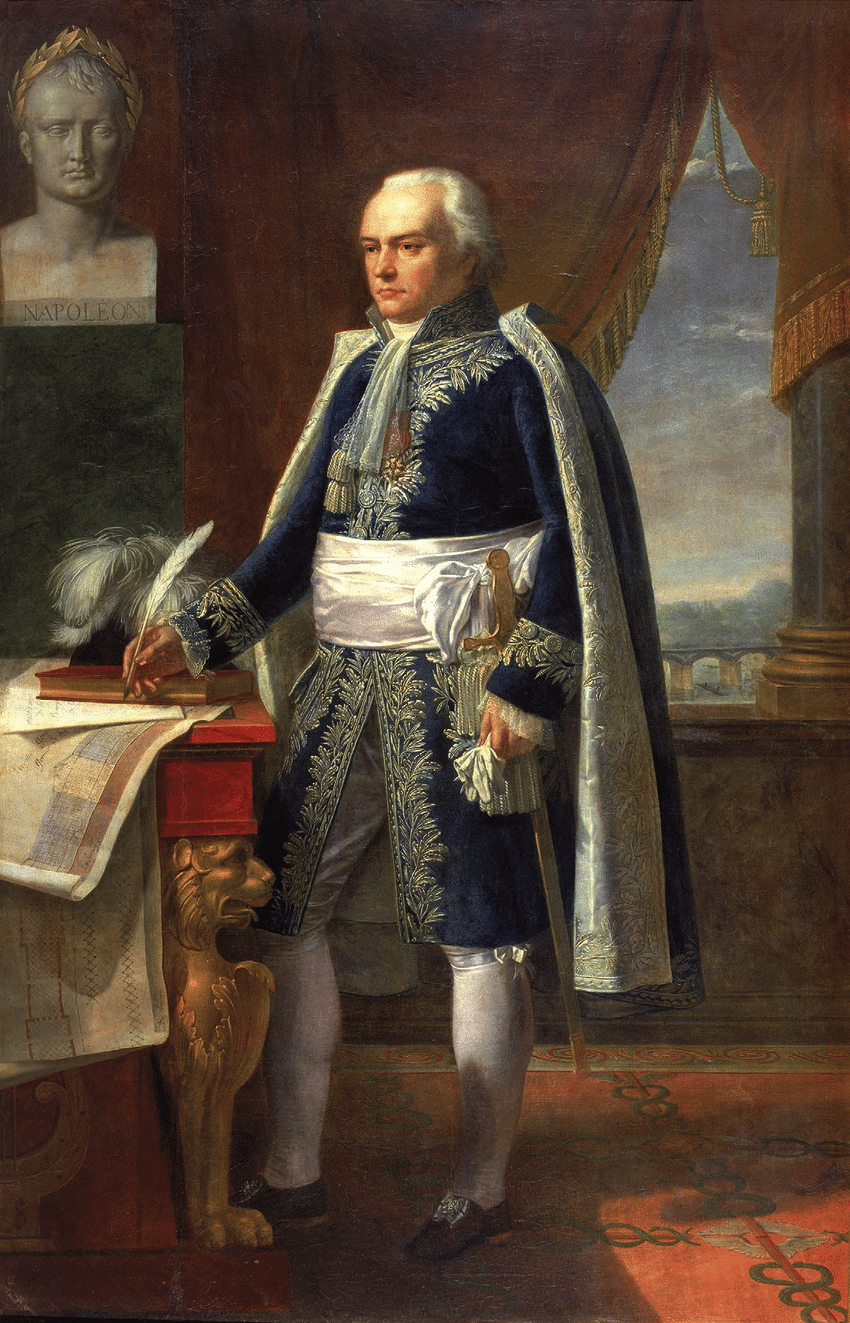
- Emmanuel Crétet, Comte de Champmol
- Born: 10 February 1747; Le Pont-de-Beauvoisin, Savoie, France
- Died: 28 November 1809 (aged 62); Paris, France
- Occupations: Merchant, financier and politician
- Known for: First governor of the Banque de France

Emmanuel Crétet, Comte de Champmol (10 February 1747 – 28 November 1809) was a French merchant, financier and politician. He was the first governor of the Banque de France.

== Early years ==
Emmanuel Crétet was born in the village of Le Pont-de-Beauvoisin, Savoie, on 10 February 1747, the youngest of six children of a timber merchant. He studied with the Oratorians before joining a merchant in Bordeaux. He made seven voyages to the West Indies, on some of which he commanded the ship. He spent time in England, where he acquired liberal views. Crétet then settled in Paris in the trading house of an uncle. He inherited his uncle's business. Shortly before the French Revolution (1789–1799) he had become Director of a fire insurance company.

== First Republic ==
Crétet disapproved of the excesses of the Terror. He moved to Dijon, where he became a trader. He purchased some of the national assets that were sold by the revolutionary government. On 4 May 1791 he bought the chartreuse of Champmol in the department of Côte-d'Or, founded in 1384 and burial place of the Valois Dukes of Burgundy. He destroyed the church of the former monastery and most of the buildings, apart from those he kept for his own use or to decorate the garden. The next year the tombs and coffins of the dukes were transported to Saint-Bénigne. The altar and some woodwork from the church was also reassembled.

Crétet entered politics in 1795. He was elected to represent Côte-d'Or in the Council of Ancients, the Upper House of the French Directory, taking his seat at the start of Brumaire, year IV. There he began a political career dedicated to economic and financial administration.

== Consulate ==
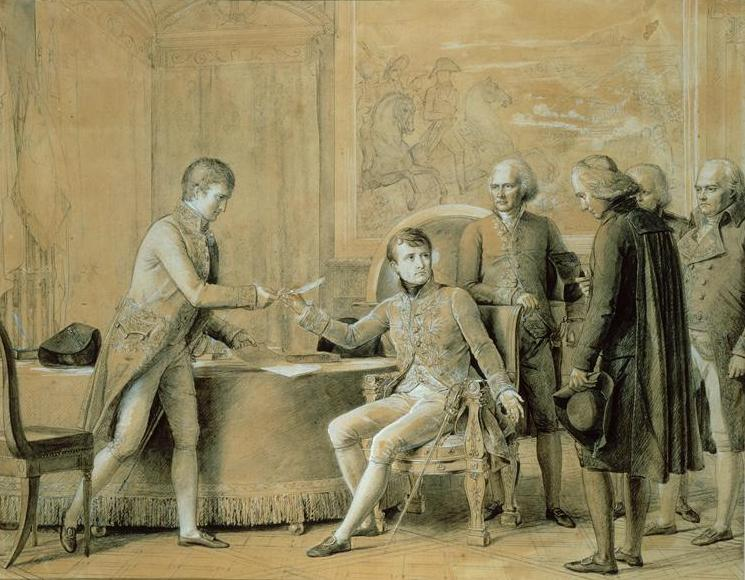
Signature of the Concordat on 15 July 1801. From left to right: Joseph Bonaparte, Napoleon, Portalis, Cardinal Giuseppe Spina, d'Hauterive and Crétet.

Crétet supported the coup-d'état of 18 Brumaire (9 November 1799) in which Napoleon came to power as First Consul. On 4 Nivôse year VIII he was appointed both to the Senate and to the Council of State. He was named Councilor of State in charge of bridges and roads. He was willing to support new construction techniques, such as iron bridges in Paris. He undertook various canal projects, of which the Saint-Quentin canal was the first.

Crétet was one of the most active negotiators of the Concordat that reestablished the Catholic religion in France. He was one of the signatories to the Concordat of 15 July 1801 that aimed to achieve peace with the church.

On 11 Thermidor Year X Crétet issued a report on a central bank for France. He said it must be independent of the government, free in the way it used its capital and credit. If the government interfered, the bank would never establish credit and would be bound to fail.

== Empire ==
Crétet was a member of committees charged with drawing up the statutes of the central bank, and was appointed first governor of the Banque de France by imperial decree on 25 April 1806. On 9 August 1807 he left the bank to become Minister of the Interior. He spent lavishly on monuments, and encouraged commerce, manufacturing, learning and the arts. He had the Stock Exchange built in Paris and the Granary, which was burned by the Paris Commune in 1871. Crétet was appointed Commander of the Legion of Honour. Napoleon made him Comte de Champmol on 26 April 1808.

== Death ==
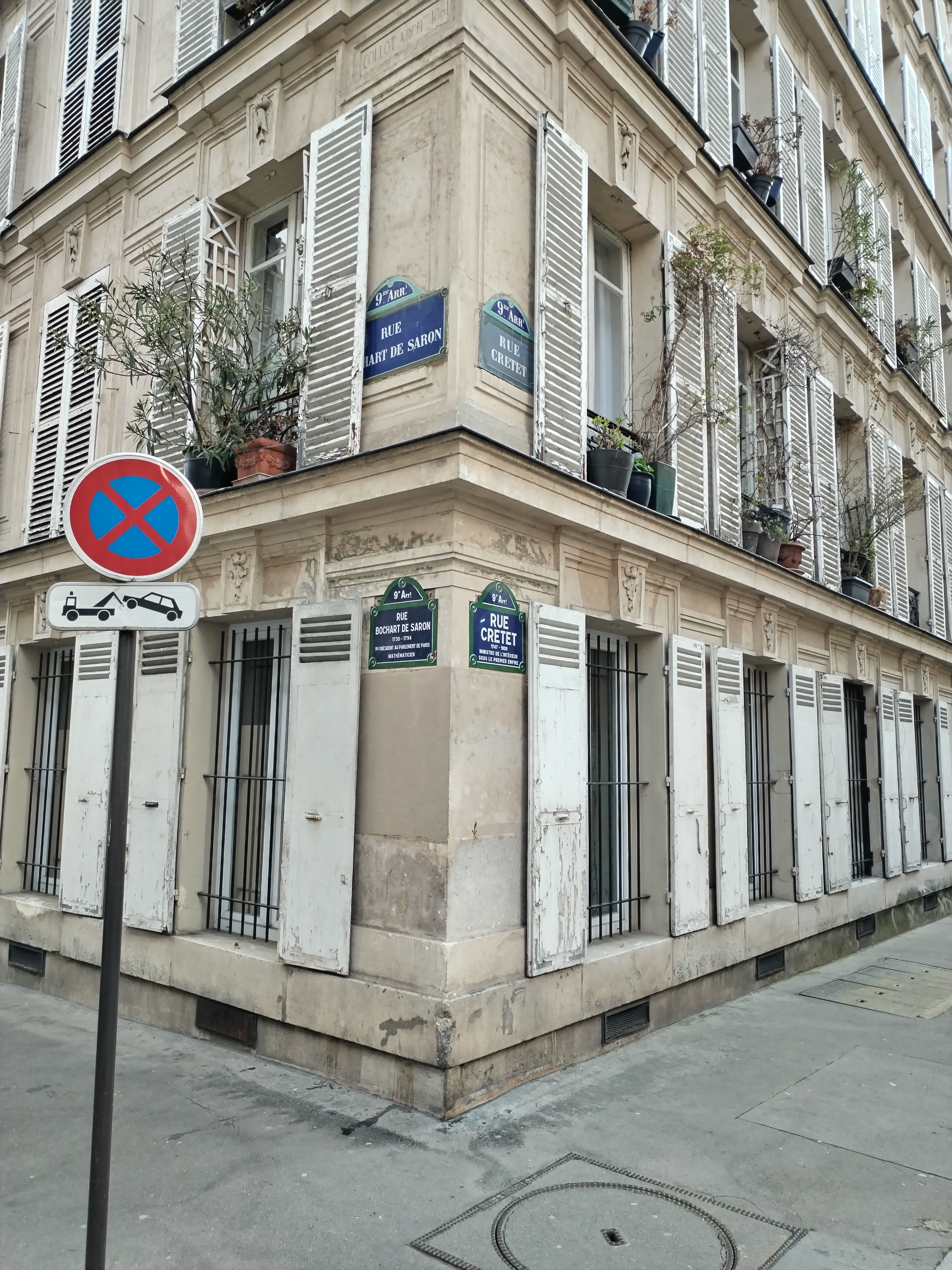
Rue Crétet, Paris

Crétet resigned due to sickness on 1 October 1809 and was replaced by Joseph Fouché. Crétet died on 28 November 1809, aged 62. The emperor decreed that he should be given great honors at his funeral. He was buried in the Panthéon, Paris. Rue Crétet, a short street in the 9th arrondissement of Paris, is named after him.

Political offices
Preceded by Jean-Antoine Marbot	President of the Council of Ancients; 1797-1797	Succeeded by Jean-Pierre Lacombe-Saint-Michel
Preceded by Jean-Baptiste de Nompère de Champagny	Interior Minister of France; 1807-1809	Succeeded by Joseph Fouché
Preceded by -	Governor of the Bank of France; 1806-1807	Succeeded by François Jaubert
