= Le Pont-de-Beauvoisin =

Le Pont-de-Beauvoisin (French pronunciation: [lə pɔ̃ də bovwazɛ̃]) may refer to the following places in France:

- Canton of Le Pont-de-Beauvoisin, Savoie
- Two communes that belong to the same village overlapping the border of two departments:
  - Le Pont-de-Beauvoisin, Isère
  - Le Pont-de-Beauvoisin, Savoie
