= Council of Ancients =

Upper house of the Directory-era French legislature

Council of Ancients Conseil des Anciens
- French First Republic
- Emblem of the Council of Ancients

Type
- Type: Upper house

History
- Established: 2 November 1795
- Disbanded: 10 November 1799
- Preceded by: National Convention (unicameral)
- Succeeded by: Sénat conservateur
- Seats: 250

Meeting place
- Salle du Manège, Paris

The Council of Ancients or Council of Elders (French: Conseil des Anciens) was a house of the French bicameral legislature under the Constitution of the Year III, during the period commonly known as the Directory (French: Directoire), from 22 August 1795 until 9 November 1799, roughly the second half of the period generally referred to as the French Revolution.

== Role and function ==
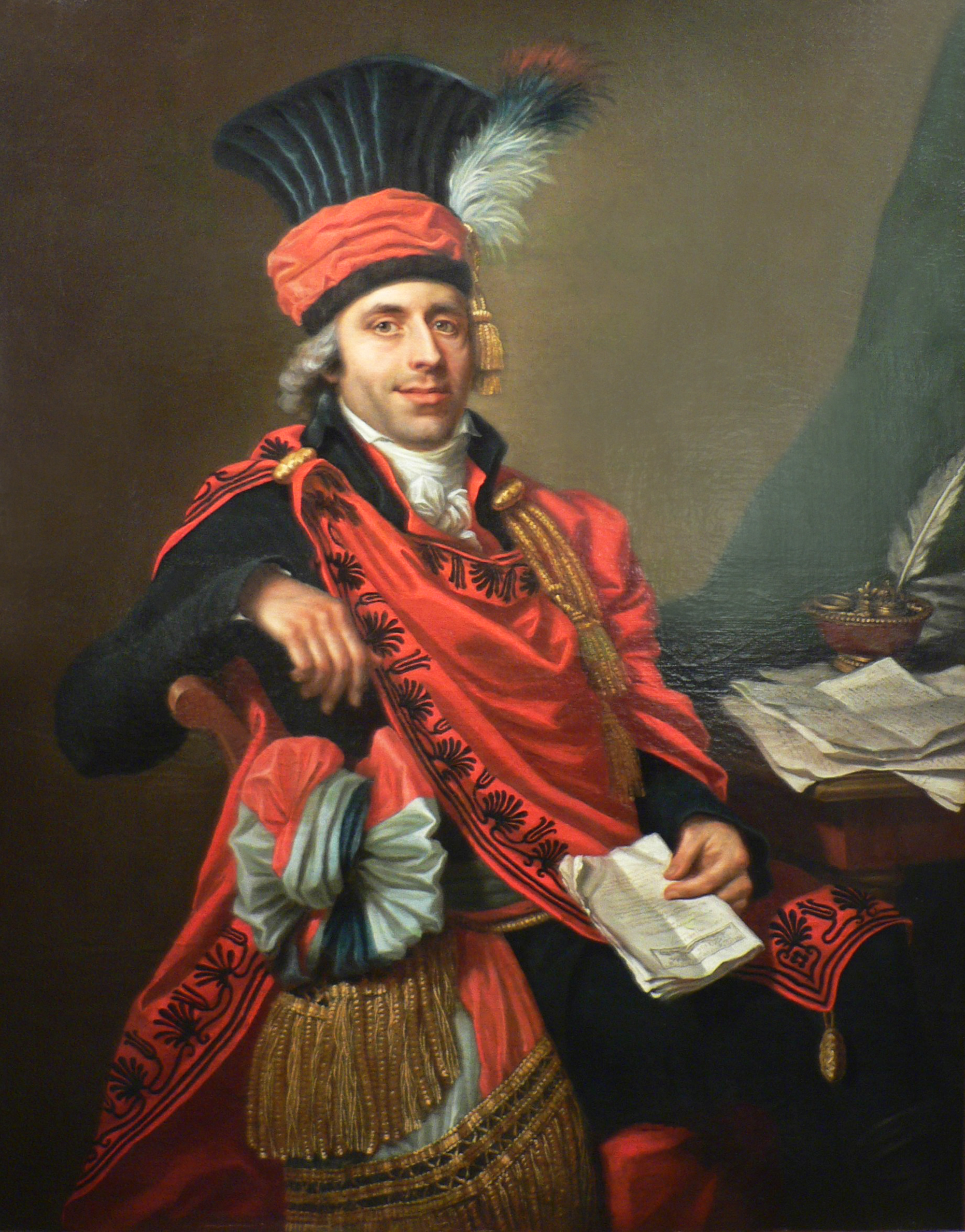
Thomas Bouquerot de Voligny (1755–1841) in his uniform as a member of the Council of Ancients (Musée de la Révolution française)

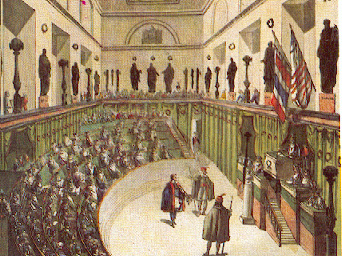
The Council of Ancients in session

The Council of Ancients was the senior of the two-halves of the republican legislative system. The Ancients were 250 members who could accept or reject laws put forward by the Council of Five Hundred (Conseil des Cinq-Cents). Each member had to be at least forty years of age, and a third of them would be replaced annually. They had no authority to draft laws, but any bills that they renounced could not be reintroduced for at least a year.

Besides functioning as a legislative body, the Ancients chose five Directors, who jointly held executive power, from the list of names put forward by the Council of Five Hundred. The Council of Ancients had their own distinctive official uniform, with robes, cape and hat, just as did the Council of Five Hundred and the Directors. Under the Thermidorean constitution, as Boissy d'Anglas put it, the Council of Five Hundred was to be the imagination of the Republic, and the Council of Ancients its reason.

The name adopted for the body was based on the French translation/adaptation of the term Senate.

== Presidents of the Council of Ancients ==
- 28 October 1795: Claude Antoine Rudel Du Miral (due to age)
- 28 October 1795 – 2 November 1795: Louis-Marie de La Révellière-Lépeaux
- 2 November 1795 – 23 November 1795: Pierre-Charles-Louis Baudin, known as Baudin des Ardennes
- 23 November 1795 – 22 December 1795: François Denis Tronchet
- 22 December 1795 – 22 January 1796: Théodore Vernier
- 22 January 1796 – 20 February 1796: Guillaume François Charles Goupil de Préfelne
- 20 February 1796 – 21 March 1796: Claude Ambroise Régnier
- 21 March 1796 – 20 April 1796: Jacques Antoine Creuzé-Latouche
- 20 April 1796 – 20 May 1796: Jean-Barthélemy Lecouteulx de Canteleu
- 20 May 1796 – 19 June 1796: Charles-François Lebrun
- 19 June 1796 – 19 July 1796: Jean Étienne Marie Portalis
- 19 July 1796 – 18 August 1796: Jean Dussaulx
- 18 August 1796 – 23 September 1796: Honoré Muraire
- 23 September 1796 – 22 October 1796: Roger Ducos
- 22 October 1796 – 21 November 1796: Jean-Girard Lacuée
- 21 November 1796 – 21 December 1796: Jean-Jacques Bréard, known as Bréard-Duplessis
- 21 December 1796 – 20 January 1797: Boniface Paradis
- 20 January 1797 – 19 February 1797: Sébastien Ligeret de Beauvais
- 19 February 1797 – 21 March 1797: Joseph Clément Poullain de Grandprey
- 21 March 1797 – 20 April 1797: Jean François Bertrand Delmas
- 20 April 1797 – 20 May 1797: Edme-Bonaventure Courtois
- 20 May 1797 – 19 June 1797: François Barbé-Marbois
- 19 June 1797 – 19 July 1797: Louis Bernard de Saint-Affrique
- 19 July 1797 – 18 August 1797: Pierre Samuel Dupont de Nemours
- 18 August 1797 – 4 September 1797: André-Daniel Laffon de Ladebat, known as Laffon-Ladébat
- 6 September 1797 – 23 September 1797: Jean-Antoine Marbot
- 23 September 1797 – 22 October 1797: Emmanuel Crétet
- 22 October 1797 – 21 November 1797: Jean-Pierre Lacombe-Saint-Michel
- 21 November 1797 – 21 December 1797: Jean François Philibert Rossée
- 21 December 1797 – 20 January 1798: Jean-Baptiste Marragon
- 20 January 1798 – 19 February 1798: Jean Rousseau
- 19 February 1798 – 21 March 1798: Pardoux Bordas
- 21 March 1798 – 20 April 1798: Étienne Mollevaut
- 20 April 1798 – 20 May 1798: Jacques Poisson de Coudreville
- 20 May 1798 – 19 June 1798: Claude Ambroise Régnier
- 19 June 1798 – 19 July 1798: Jean-Antoine Marbot
- 19 July 1798 – 18 August 1798: Étienne Maynaud Bizefranc de Lavaux
- 18 August 1798 – 23 September 1798: Pierre Antoine Laloy
- 23 September 1798 – 22 October 1798: Benoît Michel Decomberousse
- 22 October 1798 – 21 November 1798: Emmanuel Pérès de Lagesse
- 21 November 1798 – 21 December 1798: Jean-Augustin Moreau de Vormes
- 21 December 1798 – 20 January 1799: Jean-Baptiste Perrin des Vosges
- 20 January 1799 – 19 February 1799: Dominique Joseph Garat
- 19 February 1799 – 21 March 1799: Jean-Aimé Delacoste
- 21 March 1799 – 20 April 1799: Mathieu Depère
- 20 April 1799 – 20 May 1799: Claude-Pierre Dellay d'Agier
- 20 May 1799 – 19 June 1799: Charles Claude Christophe Gourdan
- 19 June 1799 – 19 July 1799: Pierre-Charles-Louis Baudin, known as Baudin des Ardennes
- 19 July 1799 – 18 August 1799: Louis-Thibaut Dubois-Dubais
- 18 August 1799 – 24 September 1799: Mathieu-Augustin Cornet
- 24 September 1799 – 23 October 1799: Joseph Cornudet des Chaumettes
- 23 October 1799 – 10 November 1799: Louis-Nicolas Lemercier

== See also ==
- Senate (France)
- List of presidents of the Senate (France)
- Council of the Republic (France)
- Chamber of Peers (France)

== Sources ==
- http://www.rulers.org/frgovt1.html
