= Jean de Marbot =

Jean de Marbot (English: /ʒɒ̃ mɑːrˈboʊ/, French: [ʒɑ̃ maʁbo]) may refer to:

- Jean-Antoine Marbot (1754–1800), French general and politician
- Marcellin Marbot (Jean-Baptiste Antoine Marcelin Marbot; 1782–1854), French general
