= Jean-Baptiste Nompère de Champagny, duc de Cadore =

French admiral and politician

Jean-Baptiste Nompère de Champagny, 1st duc de Cadore (4 August 1756 – 3 July 1834) was a French admiral and politician.

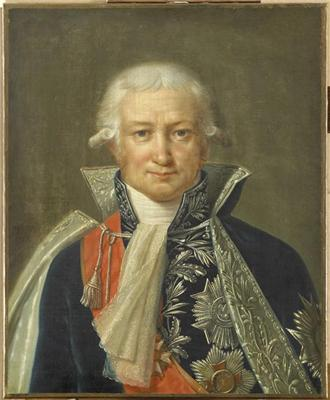
Jean-Baptiste de Nompère de Champagny, 1st duc de Cadore

He was born in Roanne, Loire. Entering the French royal navy in 1774, he fought through the war in America and resigned in 1787. Elected député by the noblesse of Forez to the Estates-General in 1789, he went over to the Third Estate on the 21st of June and collaborated in the work of the National Constituent Assembly, especially occupying himself with the reorganization of the navy.

== Career ==
A political career seems to have attracted him little; he remained in private life from 1791 to 1799, when Napoleon named him member of the council of state. From July 1801 to August 1804 he was ambassador of France at Vienna, and directed with great intelligence the incessant negotiations between the two courts.

In August 1804 Napoleon made him minister of the interior, and in this position, which he held for three years, he proved an administrator of the first order. In addition to the ordinary charges of his office, he had to direct the recruitment of the army, organize the Exposition des produits de l'industrie française of 1806, and to complete the public works undertaken in Paris and throughout France.

He was devoted to Napoleon, on whom he lavished adulation in his speeches. In August 1807 the Emperor chose him to succeed Talleyrand as minister for foreign affairs. He directed the annexation of the Papal States in April 1808, worked to secure the abdication of Charles IV of Spain in May 1808, negotiated the Peace of Vienna (1809) and the marriage of Napoleon.

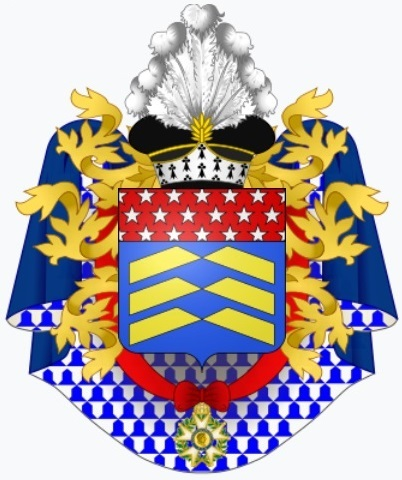
Heraldic achievement of Jean-Baptiste Nompère de Champagny, Duke of Cadore

The Emperor rewarded him with the rare hereditary title of a duché grand-fief als duc de Cadore ("Duke of Cadore", extinct 1893) in Friuli, in Napoleon's own kingdom of Italy.

In April 1811 a quarrel with the Emperor led to his retirement, and he obtained the sinecure office of intendant general of the crown. In 1814, after the abdication, the Empress sent him on a fruitless mission to the Emperor of Austria. Then he went over to the Bourbons.

During the Hundred Days he again joined Napoleon. This led to his exclusion by Louis XVIII, but in 1819 he recovered his dignity of Peer of France. He died in Paris in 1834.

== Family ==
By his marriage at Saint-Vincent-de-Boisset on 22 January 1787 to Victoire Blandine Hue de Grosbois, as him born at Roanne, on 4 January 1770 and died in Paris on 4 February 1821, he had at least four sons who became men of distinction:

- Louis Alix, 2nd Duke of Cadore (Saint-Vincent-de-Boisset, 11 January 1796 - Boulogne-sur-Seine, 27 January 1870), married in Paris, 17 May 1824 Caroline Elisabeth de Lagrange (Paris, 6 August 1806 - Paris, 1 September 1870)
- François (1804–1882) was a well-known author, who was made a member of the French Academy in 1869. His great work was a history of the Roman Empire, in three parts, (1) Les Césars (1841–1843, 4 vols.), (2) Les Antonins (1863, 3 vols.), (3) Les Césars du IIIè siècle (1870, 3 vols.).
- Napoleon (1806–1872) published a Traité de la police municipale in 4 volumes (1844–1861), and was a deputy in the Corps Législatif from 1852 to 1870.
- Jerome Paul (1809–1886) was also deputy in the Corps Législatif from 1853 to 1870, and was made honorary chamberlain in 1859. He worked at the official publication of the correspondence of Napoleon I.

Political offices
Preceded by Jean-Antoine Chaptal	French Minister of the Interior; 7 August 1804 – 9 August 1807	Succeeded by Emmanuel Crétet
Preceded by Charles Maurice de Talleyrand	Minister of Foreign Affairs; 9 August 1807 – 17 April 1811	Succeeded by Hugues-Bernard Maret, duc de Bassano
