= Joseph Balthazard Siméon =

Count Joseph Balthazard Siméon (6 January 1781–14 September 1846) was a French politician.

He was the son of Joseph Jérôme, Comte Siméon. He entered the diplomatic service under the Empire. At the Restoration he was successively prefect of Var, Doubs and Pas-de-Calais. He was director-general of fine arts in 1828, and had a great reputation as a connoisseur and collector. He was also a Councillor of State from 1829 and a Peer of France.

== Biography ==
The son of Count Joseph Jérôme Siméon, he studied at Count Alexandre d'Hauterive's school for diplomats, where he was admitted in January 1800 as a student alongside Joseph-Marie, comte Portalis and Antoine-Marie Roederer.

He joined the Foreign Office in 1800 and was attached to Joseph Bonaparte at the Treaty of Lunéville. Legation secretary in Florence in 1801, then first secretary of the embassy in Rome, he was appointed chargé d'affaires at the court of Stuttgart. From 1807 onwards, he represented the King of Westphalia in Berlin, Darmstadt, Frankfurt, and Dresden.

A supporter of the Bourbon Restoration in France, he held several administrative positions under Louis XVIII. He was successively appointed prefect of Var in 1815, Doubs in 1818, then Pas-de-Calais from 1818 to 1824, and was appointed maître des requêtes (master of petitions) to the Conseil d'État in 1821.

On 13 January 1828, he was appointed Director General of Fine Arts. He became a member of the Council of State the following year. Louis Philippe I elevated him to the rank of Peer of France on 11 September 1835.

An art collector, painter, and engraver, he was a member of the Société des Antiquaires de France and an honorary member of the Académie des Beaux-Arts (elected in 1828).

He died on 11 September 1846, in Dieppe and was buried in the Père Lachaise Cemetery (30th division). Married to Antoinette Préveraud de Pombreton, he was the father of Henri Siméon and the father-in-law of Baron Laurent Nivière.
