= Claude Ambroise Régnier =

French lawyer and politician (1746–1814)

Claude Ambroise Régnier duc de Massa
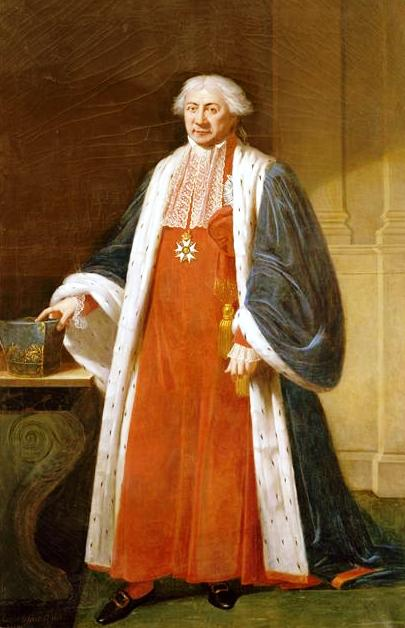
- Régnier by Robert Lefèvre, 1808

Minister of Justice
- In office 14 September 1802 – 18 May 1804

Minister of Justice
- In office 18 May 1804 – 13 June 1813
- Monarch: Napoleon I
- Succeeded by: Louis-Mathieu Molé

Personal details
- Born: 6 April 1746 Blâmont, France
- Died: 24 June 1814 (aged 68) Paris, France
- Occupation: Lawyer and politician
- Awards: Grand Eagle of the Legion of Honor

Claude Ambroise Régnier, duc de Massa (6 April 1746 – 24 June 1814), was a French lawyer and politician. He was a deputy in 1789, a member of the Council of Ancients, a member of the Senate and a Minister.

== Early years ==
Claude Ambroise Régnier was born in Blâmont, now in Meurthe-et-Moselle, on 6 April 1746. (Note: Another source, based on careful examination of records, gives his date of birth as 5 November 1746.) At that time Blâmont was in the Principality of Salm-Salm. His paternal grandfather was Jean-Antoine Régnier, procureur of the bailliage of Saint-Diey-des-Vosges. His maternal grandfather was Jean-Baptiste Thiry, king's counsel in the Blâmont town hall. His parents were Ambroise Régnier and Françoise Thiry. In 1748 his father was an innkeeper. In 1780 he is described as an old fermier des domaines (tax collector), and in 1784 as a merchant. Claude Régnier's mother died in 1785, aged 65. His father lived on until 1806, when he died at the age of 87.

Régnier began his studies in Saint-Dié under his uncle, abbé Régnier, the main parish priest. He went on the University of Strasbourg, and graduated with a bachelor-in-law. He entered the Parlement in 1765, and began practicing law in Lunéville. In 1769 Prince Louis of Salm-Salm called Régnier to Senones and made him his counselor and Attorney General, entrusting him with the administration of the principality. Régnier left this position in 1773 to resume his career as lawyer in Nancy, Lorraine. There he became one of the leading lawyers in the Civil Division.

== French Revolution ==
Régnier was enthusiastic about the French Revolution, and on 6 April 1789 was elected deputy for the third estate for Nancy in the Estates General. He was a member of the legislative commission. After the flight of the king, on 22 June 1791 Régnier was sent as commissioner to the departments of the Rhine to receive the oaths of the troops. On return, he sat constantly on the constitutional committee, and was known for the clarity of his expression.

Régnier went underground during the Reign of Terror, only reappearing on the political scene after the promulgation of the Constitution of year III. On 23 Vendémiaire year IV (15 October 1795) he was elected deputy for the Meurthe Department in the Council of Ancients, and was reelected on 23 Germinal year VII (12 April 1799). He sat on the left.

== Napoleonic era ==
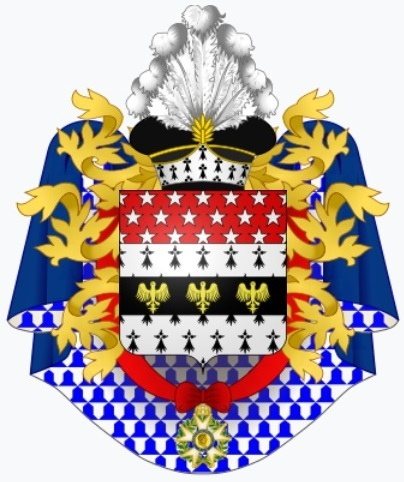
Heraldic achievement of Claude-Ambroise Régnier, duc de Massa

Régnier was a partisan of General Bonaparte and supported his coup-d'état. On 17 Brumaire year VIII (8 November 1799), he took part in a meeting at the house of Lemercier, Chairman of the Ancients, to prepare for the planned coup. On the morning of 18 Brumaire he presented to the council a draft decree that transferred the two legislative chambers to Saint-Cloud. He was appointed a member of the Senate and of the Council of State, and became one of the main editors of the civil code. He showed a deep understanding of jurisprudence.

On 27 Fructidor year X (14 September 1802) Napoleon named Régnier chief judge and Minister of Justice, positions he held until 20 November 1813. Until 10 July 1804 he was also in charge of the Ministry of Police, which he handed over to Joseph Fouché. He was made a comte de l’Empire (count of the empire) on 24 April 1808 and duc de Massa (Duke of Massa di Carrara) on 15 August 1809. On leaving the ministry of Justice Regnier was made Minister of State and president of the legislative body. He died in Paris on 24 June 1814 a few months after Napoleon fell from power.

== Sources ==
- Delaval, Paul (1909). "UN MINISTRE LORRAIN SOUS L'EMPIRE LE GRAND JUGE RÉGNIER DUC DE MASSA". Le Pays Lorrain et le Pays Messin.
- De Martimprey (1889). "RÉGNIER, DUC DE MASSA, ET SA FAMILLE". Journal de la Société d'archéologie et du Comité du Musée lorrain.
- Duvernoy, E. (1898). "L'ÉTAT CIVIL DU GRAND-JUGE RÉGNIER, DUC DE MASSA". Journal de la Société d'archéologie et du Comité du Musée lorrain.
- Larousse, Pierre (1877). "Régnier (Claude-Ambroise, duc de Massa)". Grand dictionnaire universel du XIXe siècle. Vol. 13. Paris.
- Robert, Adolphe; Cougny, Gaston (1891). "Saint-Cricq (Pierre-Laurent-Barthélemy, Comte de)". Dictionnaire des parlementaires français de 1789 à 1889 (PDF). Vol. V.

Political offices
Preceded by Guillaume Goupil de Préfelne	President of the Council of Ancients; 1796-1796	Succeeded by Jacques Antoine Creuzé-Latouche
Preceded by Jacques Poisson de Coudreville	President of the Council of Ancients; 1798-1798	Succeeded by Jean-Antoine Marbot
Preceded by Pierre de Montesquiou-Fezensac	Presidents of the National Assembly; 1813-1814	Succeeded by -
