= Honoré Muraire =

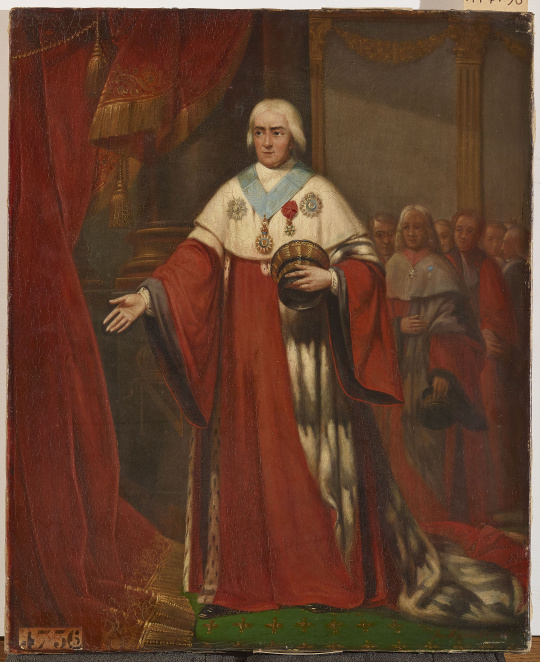

Personal details
- Born: 5 November 1750 Draguignan, Kingdom of France
- Died: 20 November 1837 (aged 87) Paris, Kingdom of France

Honoré Muraire, (French pronunciation: [ɔnɔʁe myʁɛʁ], 5 November 1750 - 20 November 1837) was a French statesman of the French Revolution. Under the Ancien Régime he held the title of seigneur of Favas; later under the French Empire he held a title of comte de l'Empire.

== Biography ==
Born in Draguignan, Provence, he was the son of Augustin Muraire, a lawyer of the court, and of Madeleine Castillon. Muraire became a lawyer and built up a practice in his home town. He was appointed in 1785, at the age of 35, mayor and first consul of Draguignan, and in 1785 and in 1786, he was designated a representative to provincial states of the pays d'etat of Provence.

== French Revolution ==
When the social and political movements of the French Revolution started in 1789, Honoré Muraire was charged by the municipality of Draguignan to participate in the preparation of the cahiers de doléances, and assisted in writing up a plan for the reform of the courts and a draft regulation concerning the bourgeois militia.

In 1790, he went on a mission to the National Assembly to promote his hometown for the coveted designation as chef-lieu for the new department of Var instead of Toulon, as Draguignan was more centrally located. He would return from his mission to take the position of president of the district. It was during this period that he became involved in freemasonry.

The voters of the district of Draguignan elected him to the Legislative Assembly on 8 September 1791 (elected second out of eight, by 250 votes on 489 voting). He sat on the Legislative Committee, and reported to the assembly on 15 February 1792, in his capacity as rapporteur, a series of recommendations for marriage reform. He was appointed president of the Assembly (13–27 May 1792).

As the fall of the French monarchy unfolded in the summer of 1792, Muraire took the side of the doomed Louis XVI. On 13 July 1792, Muraire requested action be taken against Pétion and Manuel, respectively mayor and attorney of the Paris Commune, as conspirators and accomplices of the protests of 20 June 1792, and later defended the actions of the monarchist general La Fayette.

For adopting these unpopular positions, he was not returned to the Convention in the elections of September 1792. This setback turned to his advantage as he avoided the excesses and purges of the French Terror, although he did spend some time imprisoned in Sainte-Pelagie. He was released during the Thermidorian Reaction.

== Directory, Consulate, and Empire ==
Under the French Directory, he was elected in September 1795 (23 Vendémiaire IV) as a member of the Council of Ancients by the department of the Seine by 364 votes out of 876 voters. Following the 18 Fructidor V coup (4 September 1797), several deputies came under the threat of arrest and deportation. Muraire, who had spoken in favor of émigré and deported priests, appeared along with such conservatives as de Pastoret, Camille Jordan, and Boissy d'Anglas, on the list of suspects. Sentenced to be deported to Cayenne, French Guiana, he instead found a way to hide, and ended up sentenced to detention at the island of Oléron, where he remained more than two years.

By a decree dated 5 Nivose year VIII (25 December 1799), he is pardoned, along with his companions in exile, by the newly appointed first consul, Napoleon Bonaparte, and permitted to come to Paris and to remain there under the supervision of the department of the police.

Highly recommended by Joseph Bonaparte, a fellow freemason, Muraire was appointed as the first commissioner to the Paris Prosecutor by the first consul, before being appointed to the tribunal of cassation as a counselor 11 Germinal VIII (1 April 1800). When the original president of this institution (created in 1790), François Denis Tronchet, was appointed senator in 1801, Muraire succeeded him. Muraire received further promotions, appointed adviser to state the 14 Floreal X (4 May 1802), then the first First President of the Court of Cassation on 29 Floreal XII (19 April 1804). He requested of the Emperor, who agreed, that the court of cassation, just as the Parlements before 1789, would inaugurate its work by a religious ceremony.

His daughter Elisabeth married Élie, duc Decazes (future Prime Minister of France 1819-1820), 1 August 1805, but she died shortly thereafter.

In 1809, Napoleon I appointed him to the comte de l'Empire. He named a senator in 1811, and became a Chevalier de l'ordre de la Reunion 3 April 1812, an honour just below the Legion of Honour. He also became a Grand Office of the Legion of Honour in 1804. In recognition of such honors, Muraire served Bonaparte with much zeal.

== Restoration, Hundred Days, and later life ==
Alas, when the Emperor first fell from power, Muraire and his Court of Cassation declared that they would abide by the proclamation of Talleyrand's Provisional Government and support "the stronger side." Muraire personally complimented Comte d'Artois soon after. It is not enough to preserve him in his lofty position, and he is replaced as President of the Court by de Sèze 16 February 1815.

The Hundred Days (beginning in March 1815) briefly resurrected his fortunes, and Muraire, retaking his position at the head of the Court of Cassation, personally proclaimed the restoration of Napoleon as Emperor at the Tuileries. Of course, with the Battle of Waterloo, his political career is ruined.

Muraire spent the rest of his days in social life, literary pursuits and Masonic activities. He died 20 November 1837, at the age of 87 years, in Paris. A posthumous portrait, painted by Georges Cain, has sat since 1892 in a place of honour in the gallery of the first Civil Chamber of the Court of Cassation.
