= Pierre Charles Louis Baudin =

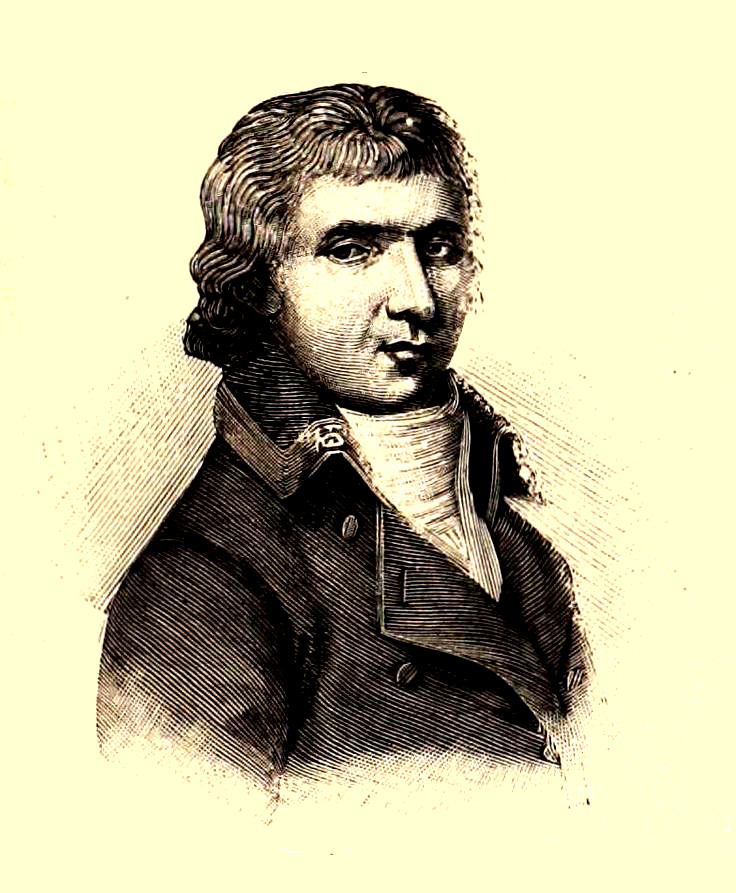

President of the National Convention
- In office 24 September 1795 – 8 October 1795
- Preceded by: Théophile Berlier
- Succeeded by: Jean Joseph Victor Génissieu

Personal details
- Born: 18 December 1748 Sedan, Ardennes, Kingdom of France
- Died: 14 October 1799 (aged 50) Paris, French Republic
- Spouse: Marie-Jeanne Elisabeth Terreaux
- Relations: Jean Henri Hassenfratz (brother-in-law)
- Children: Charles Baudin

Pierre Charles Louis Baudin, born 18 December 1748 in Sedan, Ardennes and died 14 October 1799 in Paris, was a French revolutionary and politician. He is the father of the admiral and explorer Charles Baudin and brother-in-law of the chemist Jean Henri Hassenfratz. Noted as a moderate; he opposed the execution of Louis XVI.

== Biography ==
The Baudin family had originated in Lorraine, but had been fixed since the seventeenth century in Sedan. He was the son of Anne-Alexandre Baudin, lieutenant general of the Bailiwick of Sedan, and Charlotte-Louise Lafeuille, who descended from a family of magistrates. His father destined him to the legal career; he studied in Paris under the tutelage of a disciple of Rollin and Coffin. After law school, he was received into the Bar, but the exile of the Parliament of Paris in 1771 led him to abandon this career. He agreed to become the tutor of the son of General Counsel Gilbert Voisins. Married in 1783 to Marie-Jeanne Elisabeth Terreaux (whose sister Antoinette later married Jean Henri Hassenfratz), he returned to Sedan, where he became director of the Post Office, an appointment facilitated by Voisins.

Elected mayor of Sedan in 1790, and subsequently as deputy of the Ardennes to the Legislative Assembly on 2 September 1791 by 168 votes out of 299 voters, he sat among moderates but spoke little. He was, according to historians, useful for his serious approach to social problems. He rarely went on missions, but worked hard on committees, accomplishing some of the real work of reform behind the scenes. On 5 September 1792, he was re-elected to the National Convention. At the trial of Louis XVI, he voted in favor of the appeal to the people and imprisonment of the king until a general peace was reached. Unlike some of the other men who supported this option, he was not a Signatory of the Protest of the Seventy-Three.

Named in Floreal Year III, he was one of the eleven members of the committee that drafted the Constitution of the Year III. By offering the decree of two thirds, he promoted the re-election of two thirds of conventional in the new legislative body. He served as President of the Convention from 24 September 1795 until his replacement by Genissieu on 8 October 1795. During his term, the Convention faced a royalist insurrection and declared the abolition of the death penalty from the date of conclusion of peace. They also voted to accept the Constitution of 1795. His speech honoring the executed Girondins, "In honor of the Deputies who died as Victims of Tyranny," which he made on 3 October 1795 during his presidency, illustrated the lasting effect of the Girondin eloquence upon their audiences, and "analyses the characters of the chief orators with admirable felicity of expression." It was also the first public tribute to this important group of orators. On 26 October 1795, the last day of the convention, he proposed a decree of general amnesty "for deeds exclusively connected with the Revolution" which was accepted and proclaimed.

Elected to the Council of Ancients as representative of the Ardennes with 182 votes out of 188 voters on 21 Vendémiaire Year IV (13 October 1795) and on 22 Germinal Year V (11 April 1797) he again sat among the moderates, fighting both the neo-Jacobins and the royalists of the Club de Clichy, and held positions as secretary, commissioner archives and president, 2 to 23 November 1795 and the 19 June to 19 July 1799 . On 14 December 1795, he was appointed permanent member of the National Institute of France, created a few weeks earlier, and sat in the Social Science and Law division, where with Pierre Daunou, Jean Jacques Régis de Cambacérès, Philippe-Antoine Merlin Douai, Emmanuel de Pastoret, Jean-François Champagne, Jean Philippe Coulon Garran, Julien Félix Jean Bigot de Préameneu, etc. In 1799, when France threatened to fall into a full neo-Jacobin mode, he opposed the Carousel Club and the indictment of directors returned the 30 Prairial ( 18 June 1799 ), Merlin de Douai, Treilhard and La Réveillère Lepeaux. He also served in various committees to examine social and legal issues; for example, he examined the fates of abandoned children in 1795.

Baudin opposed the increasing centralization of power under the Directory, and supported Bonaparte on his return to Egypt, but he died of gout shortly after learning Napoleon's landing at Frejus.

== Sources ==
- Joseph Thomas, Pierre-Charles-Louis Baudin]. Universal Dictionary of Biography, Cosimo, Inc., 2010v. 1, part 2, p. 290..
- Henry Morse Stephens. The Principal Speeches of the Statesmen and Orators of the French Revolution, 1789–1795. Clarendon Press, 1892, Volume 2.
- Martin S. Staum, Minerva's Message: Stabilizing the French Revolution, McGill-Queen's Press - MQUP, 1996.
