= Jean-Étienne-Marie Portalis =

French lawyer and politician (1746–1807)

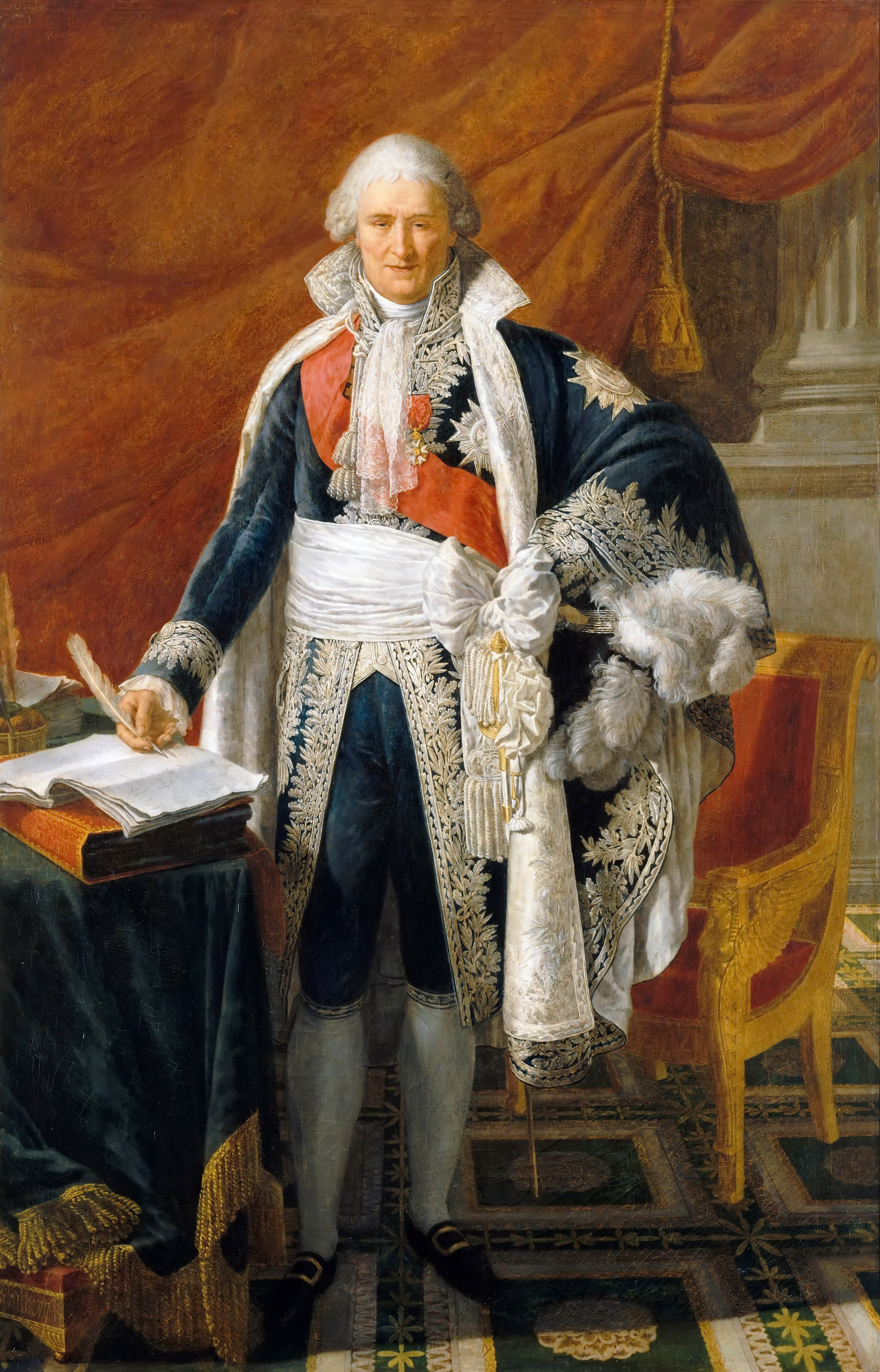
- Portrait by Claude Gautherot, 1806
- Born: 1 April 1746; Le Beausset, Kingdom of France
- Died: 25 August 1807 (aged 61); Paris, French Empire
- Resting place: Panthéon
- Education: Aix-Marseille University
- Occupations: Jurist; politician
- Organization: Académie Française (1804-1807)
- Known for: Napoleonic Code
- Children: Joseph-Marie Portalis
- Honours: Légion d'honneur

Minister of Worship
- In office 9 July 1804 – 25 August 1807
- Succeeded by: Joseph-Marie Portalis

Conseiller d'État (France)
- In office 1800 – 9 July 1804

President of the Council of Ancients
- In office 9 June 1796 – 19 July 1796
- Succeeded by: Jean Dussaulx

Jean-Étienne-Marie Portalis (1 April 1746 – 25 August 1807) was a French jurist and politician in the time of the French Revolution and the First Empire. Portalis was one of the chief draftsmen of the Napoleonic Code, which serves as the foundational framework of the French legal system. He is the father of Joseph Marie Portalis, a diplomat and statesman.

== Biography ==
=== Early life ===
Portalis was born at Le Beausset, currently in the Var département of Provence, France to a bourgeois family, and was educated by the Oratorians at their schools in Toulon and Marseille, and then went to the University of Aix. As a student, he published his first two works, Observations sur Émile (on Jean-Jacques Rousseau's Emile: Or, On Education) in 1763 and Des Préjugés in 1764.

In 1765 he became a lawyer at the parlement of Aix-en-Provence, and soon obtained so great a reputation that he was instructed by Étienne François de Choiseul in 1770 to draw up the decree authorizing the marriage of Protestants. From 1778 to 1781, Portalis was one of the four assessors or administrators of Provence.

=== Revolution ===
In November 1793, after the French First Republic had been proclaimed, he came to Paris and was thrown into prison for being the brother-in-law of Joseph Jérôme Siméon, the leader of the Federalists in Provence. He was soon released to a psychiatric hospital, where he remained until the fall of Maximilien Robespierre during the Thermidorian Reaction.

On being released he practiced as a lawyer in Paris, and, in 1795, he was elected by the capital to the Council of Ancients of the French Directory, becoming a leader of the moderate party opposed to the directory rule. As a leader of the moderates, he was targeted by the coup of 18 Fructidor, but, unlike General Charles Pichegru and François Barbé-Marbois, he managed to escape to Switzerland, then to Holstein, and did not return until after Napoleon Bonaparte established himself as the leader of the new Consulate.

=== Under Napoleon ===
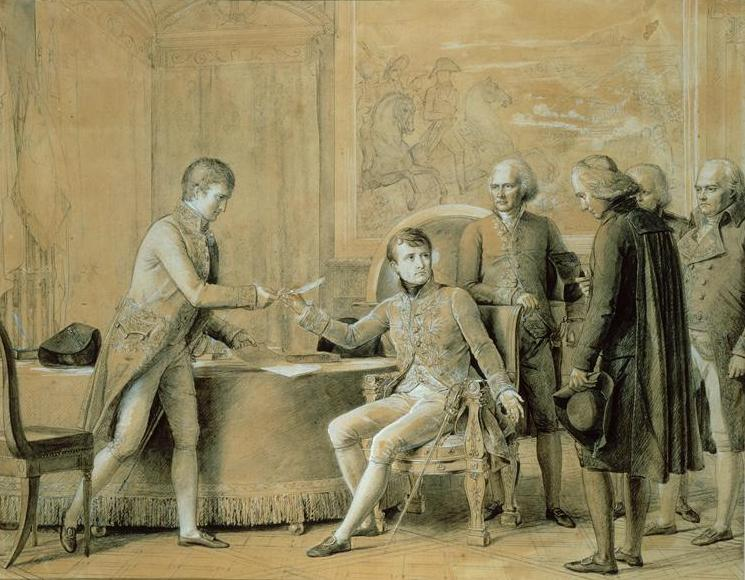
Signature of the concordat between France and the Holy See on July 15, 1801, François Gérard. Portalis is depicted standing to the right the First Consul Napoleon Bonaparte (seated).

Bonaparte made Portalis a conseiller d'état in 1800, and then charged him, with François Denis Tronchet, Félix-Julien-Jean Bigot de Préameneu, and Jacques de Maleville, with the drafting of the Civil Code (French: Code civil). He was the most notable member of this commission, and many of the most important titles, notably those on marriage and heirship, are his work.

During his 1801 speech "Discours préliminaire au projet de code civil" (Preliminary discourse on the project of the Civil Code), he presented the core principles of the code: legal certainty (non-retroactivity), the notion of "public order" (French: ordre public) and putting an end to the "arrêts de règlement" characteristic of the Parlements of the Ancien régime, as contrary to the idea that only the law prevails.

In 1801 he was placed in charge of the Department of Religion or Public Worship, and in that capacity had the chief share in drawing up the provisions of the Concordat of 1801. In 1803 he became a member of the Académie Française, in 1804 Minister of Public Worship, and in 1805 a Chevalier Grand-Croix de la Légion d'honneur. He soon after became totally blind, and, after an operation, he died at Paris.

== Tributes ==
Numerous tributes to Portalis exist in France.

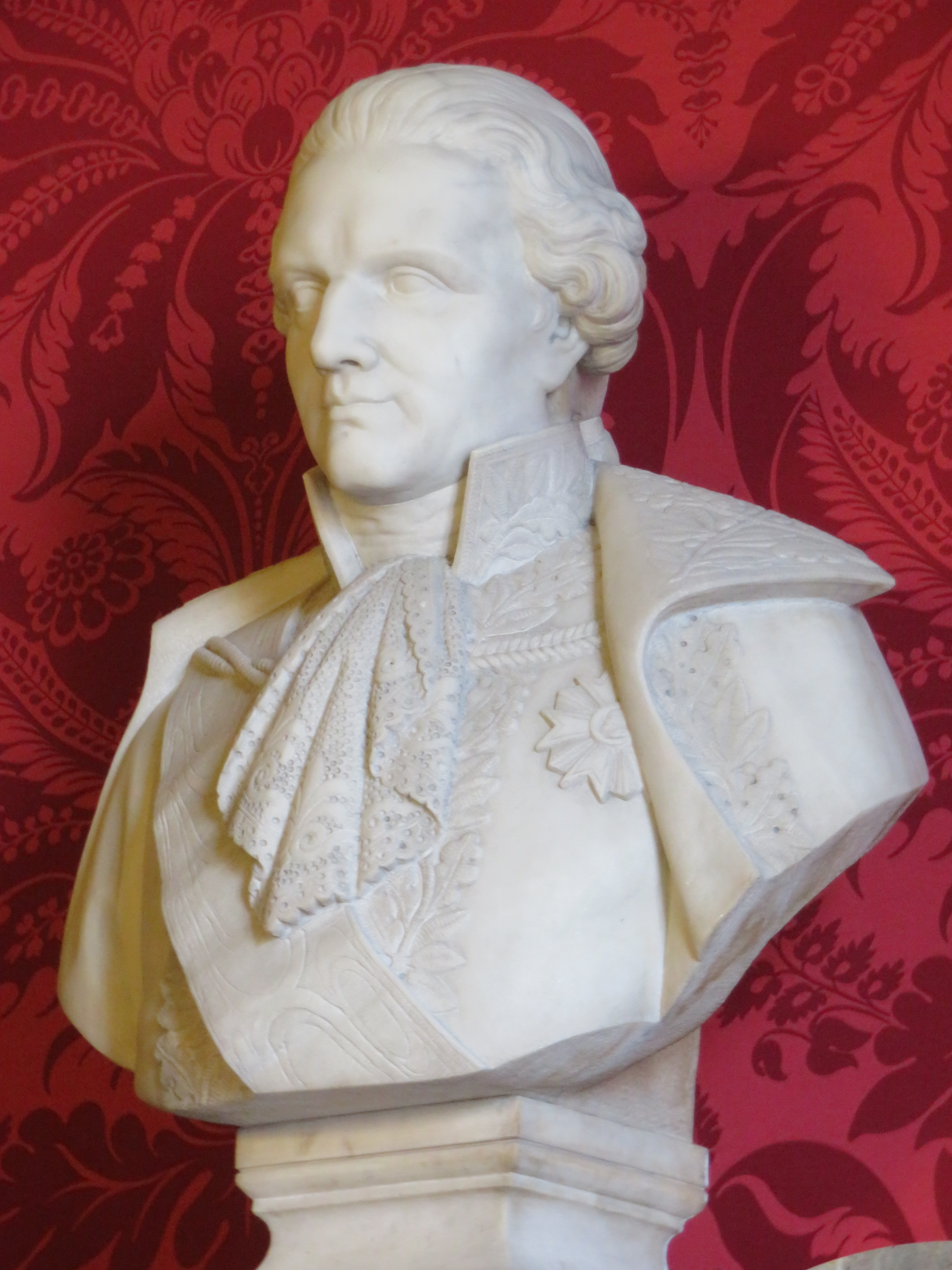
Bust of Portalis in the Conseil d'État at the Palais-Royal.

In Aix-en-Provence:

- A statue of Portalis in front of the Appellate Court of Aix-en-Provence;
- The Rue Portalis, a road in the historic city center of the province, bears his name,
- One of the buildings of the Faculty of Law of the University of Aix-Marseille bears the name of Portalis;
- An institute at the Faculty of Law bears the name "Portalis Institute";
- A plaque affixed to the facade of 25 rue de l'Opéra marks the house in which Portalis was born where he lived until the Revolution;

In Paris:

- He is buried in crypt V of the Panthéon.
- A statue of Portalis is installed in the Casimir-Perier hall of the Palais Bourbon.
- A marble representation from 1877 by Joseph Osbach is in the gallery of busts of the Court of Cassation.
- A bust of Portalis is in the offices of the Council of State at the Palais-Royal.
- The Rue Portalis in the 8th arrondissement of Paris has been named after him since 1867.

In Saint-Cyr-sur-Mer:

- A square opposite the town hall bears his name.

== See also ==
- Civil code
