= Charles Claude Christophe Gourdan =

French politician (1744–1804)

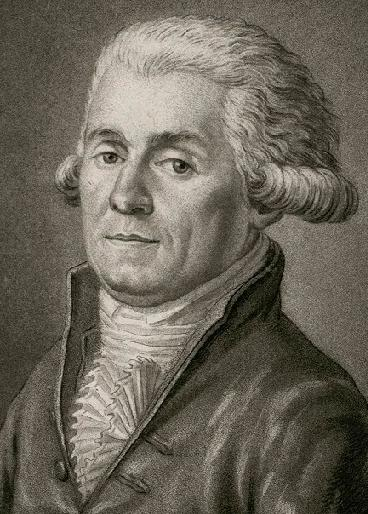

President of the Council of Ancients
- In office 20 May 1799 – 19 June 1799

Member of the Council of Ancients
- In office 11 April 1798 – 23 February 1800

Member of the Council of Five Hundred
- In office 26 October 1795 – 10 April 1798

Personal details
- Born: 1 November 1744 Champlitte, Haute-Saône, Kingdom of France
- Died: 2 August 1804 (aged 59) Champlitte, Haute-Saône, French Empire

Charles Claude Christophe Gourdan (1 November 1744 – 2 August 1804) was a politician during the time of the French Revolution. He was one of the founders of the Jacobin Club.

== Biography ==
Gourdan was born 1 November 1744 in Champlitte, Haute-Saône.

The son of a lawyer, Claude Christophe Gourdan, and his wife Claire Raillard, he attended the University of Besançon, and also became a lawyer and deputy criminal assessor of the bailiwick of Gray. At the convocation of the Estates General, he was elected deputy of the Third Estate of the fr:Bailliage d'Amont. He consistently voted for radical initiatives, including the abolition of privileges, the creation of assignats, the establishment of the new départements, the sequestration of clerical property, the sale of national property, and the suppression of noble titles.

Under the Constituent Assembly, he served as President of the Champlitte District Court. Elected president of the National Convention from February 21 to March 7, 1793, he voted for the execution of King Louis XVI. He then entered the Council of Five Hundred and was a member of the Committee of Public Safety from 7 October to 4 November 1795. He entered the Council of Ancients, of which he was also president. At the end of 1795, he was appointed judge of the Court of Cassation.

He argued against proposed restrictions on the re-establishment of banned political clubs, maintaining that the right of assembly could not be abrogated. He was also a strong advocate of a free and uncensored press. Having opposed the Coup of 18 Brumaire, he was ordered by Fouché to retire to the countryside. On 28 floréal year VIII (under the Consulate), he was appointed to the position of judge in the civil court of Vesoul, but declined to take up his post as he did not recognise a government established by force. He also resigned from his other judicial posts for the same reason.

He died on 2 August 1804, Champlitte, and is buried in the Rethel French National Cemetery.
