= Le Pont-de-Beauvoisin, Savoie =

Le Pont-de-Beauvoisin Pon (Savoyard)
- Commune
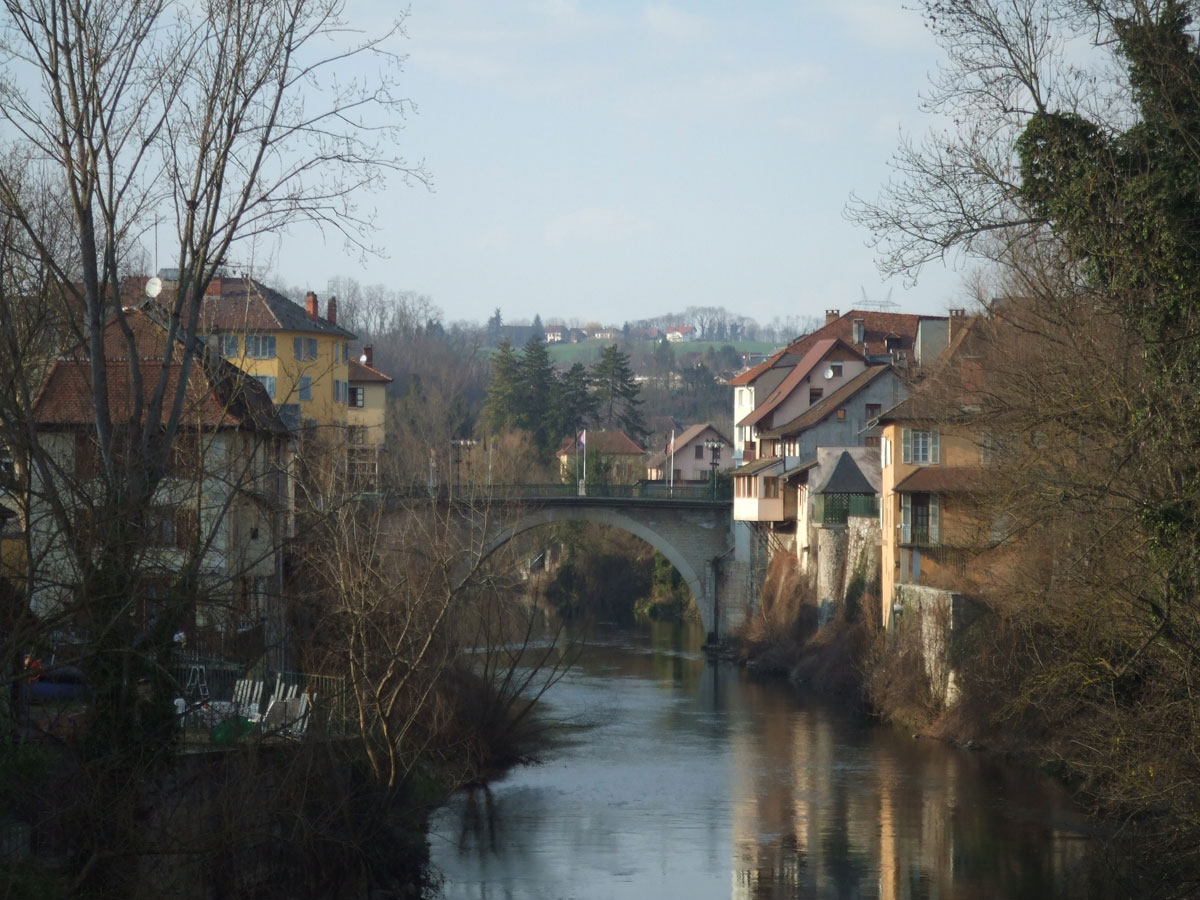
- The bridge in Le Pont-de-Beauvoisin

- Coat of arms
- Location of Le Pont-de-Beauvoisin
- Location within France Location within Auvergne-Rhône-Alpes
- Coordinates: 45°32′13″N 5°40′24″E
- Country: France
- Region: Auvergne-Rhône-Alpes
- Department: Savoie
- Arrondissement: Chambéry
- Canton: Le Pont-de-Beauvoisin
- Intercommunality: Val Guiers

Government
  - Mayor (2020–2026): Christian Berthollier
- Area^{1}: 1.83 km^{2} (0.71 sq mi)
- Highest elevation: 303 m (994 ft)
- Lowest elevation: 232 m (761 ft)
- Population (2023): 2,124
  - Density: 1,160/km^{2} (3,010/sq mi)
- Time zone: UTC+01:00 (CET)
  - Summer (DST): UTC+02:00 (CEST)
- INSEE/Postal code: 73204 /73330
- ^{1} French Land Register data, which excludes lakes, ponds, glaciers > 1 km^{2} (0.386 sq mi or 247 acres) and river estuaries.

Le Pont-de-Beauvoisin (French pronunciation: [lə pɔ̃ də bovwazɛ̃]; Savoyard: Pon) is a commune in the Savoie department in the Auvergne-Rhône-Alpes region in south-eastern France. It lies on the right bank of the Guiers, opposite Le Pont-de-Beauvoisin in Isère. Merchant, financier and politician Emmanuel Crétet was born here in 1747.

== Population ==
Historical population
Year	Pop.	±% p.a.
1968	1,412	—
1975	1,403	−0.09%
1982	1,605	+1.94%
1990	1,426	−1.47%
1999	1,572	+1.09%
2007	1,879	+2.25%
2012	1,997	+1.23%
2017	2,074	+0.76%
2023	2,124	+0.40%
Source: INSEE

== See also ==
- Communes of the Savoie department
