= Théodore Vernier =

French politician and lawyer

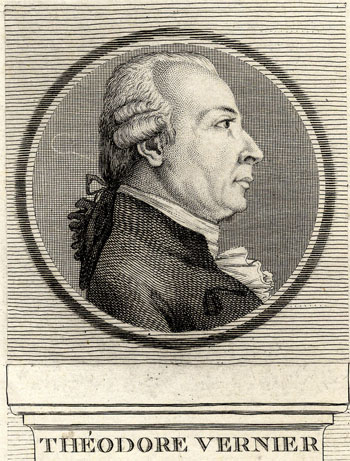
Théodore Vernier

Théodore Vernier (born 28 July 1731 at Lons-le-Saunier, Jura; died 3 February 1818 in Paris), Count of Montorient, son of Jean Baptiste Vernier, lawyer, and Claudine Leclerc, was a lawyer and French politician during the Revolution, the Directory and Consulate.

Vernier was a member of the Assemblée nationale from 27 August–9 September 1791 and a member of the Convention Nationale from 5–24 May and 3–4 June 1795.
