= Joseph Jérôme Siméon =

French jurist and politician (1749–1842)

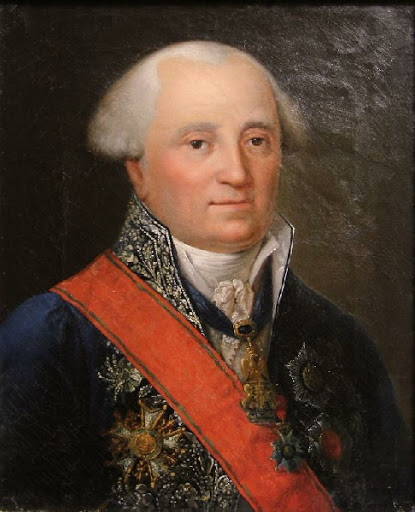
- Joseph Jérôme, comte Siméon

Minister of the Interior
- In office 20 February 1821 – 12 December 1821
- Monarch: Louis XVIII
- Prime Minister: Armand-Emmanuel du Plessis de Richelieu

Under-secretary of state for Justice
- In office 1820–?

Premier of the Kingdom of Westphalia
- In office 1807–?

Councillor of state
- In office ?

Peer of France
- In office ?

Member of the Academy of Political and Moral Sciences
- In office 1832–?

President of the Cour des Comptes
- In office 1837–?

Personal details
- Born: 30 September 1749 Aix-en-Provence, Kingdom of France
- Died: 19 January 1842 (aged 92) Paris, Kingdom of France
- Occupation: Jurist; politician

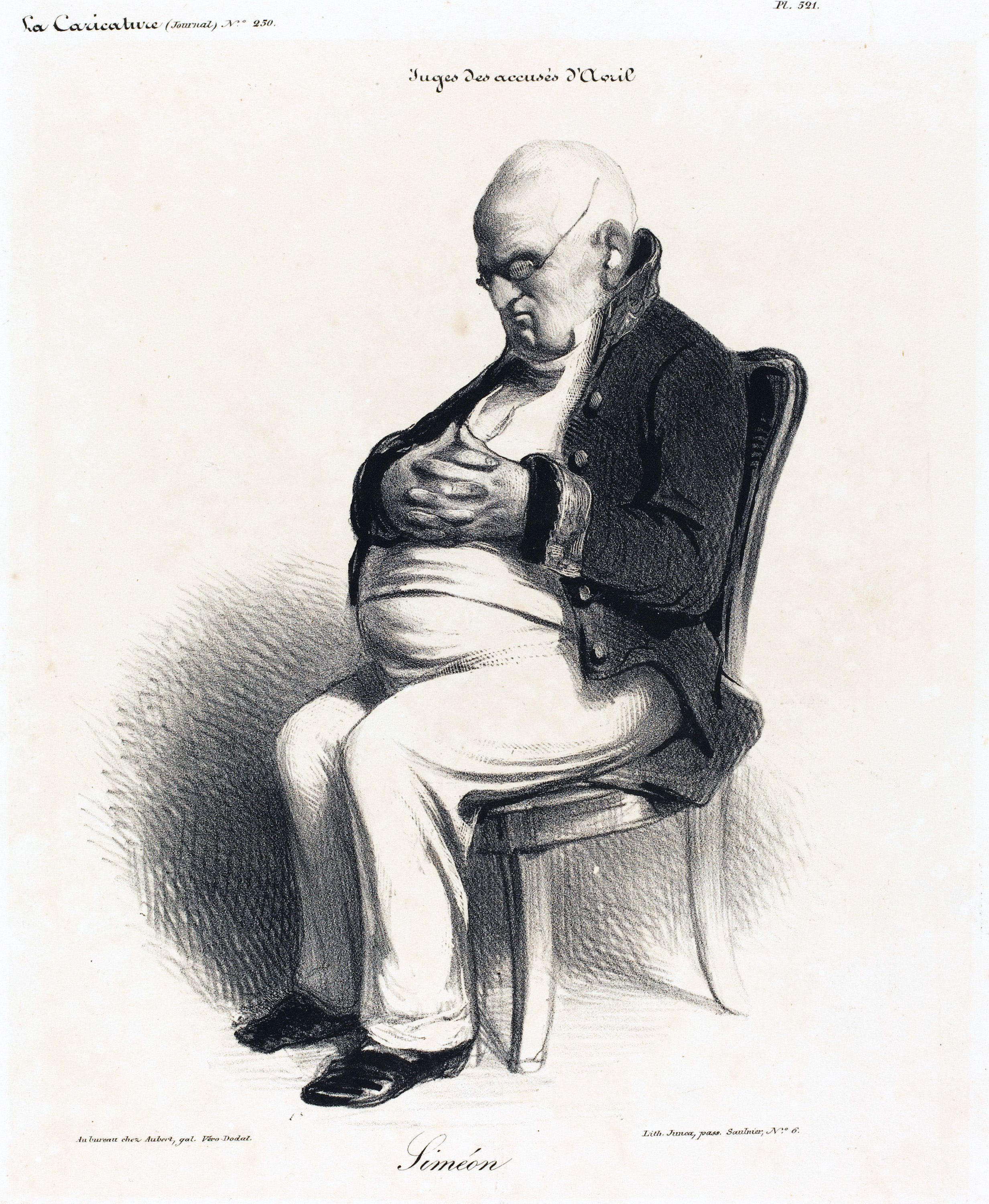
Caricature by Honoré Daumier, 1835.

Count Joseph Jérôme Siméon (30 September 1749 – 19 January 1842) was a French jurist and politician. His son, Joseph Balthasar, Comte Siméon, was a noted diplomat.

== Early life ==
Born in Aix-en-Provence, he was the son of Joseph-Sextius Siméon (1717–1788), a professor of Law and royal secretary for the parlement of Provence.

== Career ==
=== Revolution ===
Siméon followed his father's profession.

He was pursued under the Reign of Terror for his share in the Girondist movement in 1793, and only returned to France after the Thermidorian Reaction.

A deputy in the Council of the Five Hundred, he sided with the conservative side. In 1797, for protesting against the Coup of 18 Fructidor, he was imprisoned until the Napoleon Bonaparte's Coup of 18 Brumaire (9 November). In the Tribunate, Siméon had an important share in the preparation of the Napoleonic Code, being rewarded by a seat in the Conseil d'État of the French Consulate.

=== Empire and Restoration ===
As a figure of the First French Empire, he was one of the commissioners sent in 1807 to organize the new Kingdom of Westphalia, and was premier of King Jérôme. He served the Bourbon Restoration as councillor of state and a Peer of France. In 1820, he was under-secretary of state for Justice, and in the next year Minister of the Interior until the fall of the Armand-Emmanuel Richelieu ministry (12 December 1821).

A baron of the Empire, created count by the Restoration, he was admitted to the Academy of Political and Moral Sciences in 1832, and in 1837 he became president of the Cour des Comptes.

== Death ==
He died in Paris aged 93. His daughter Eleonora married General Giuseppe Lechi.
