= Jean-Antoine Marbot =

French general & politician (1754–1800)

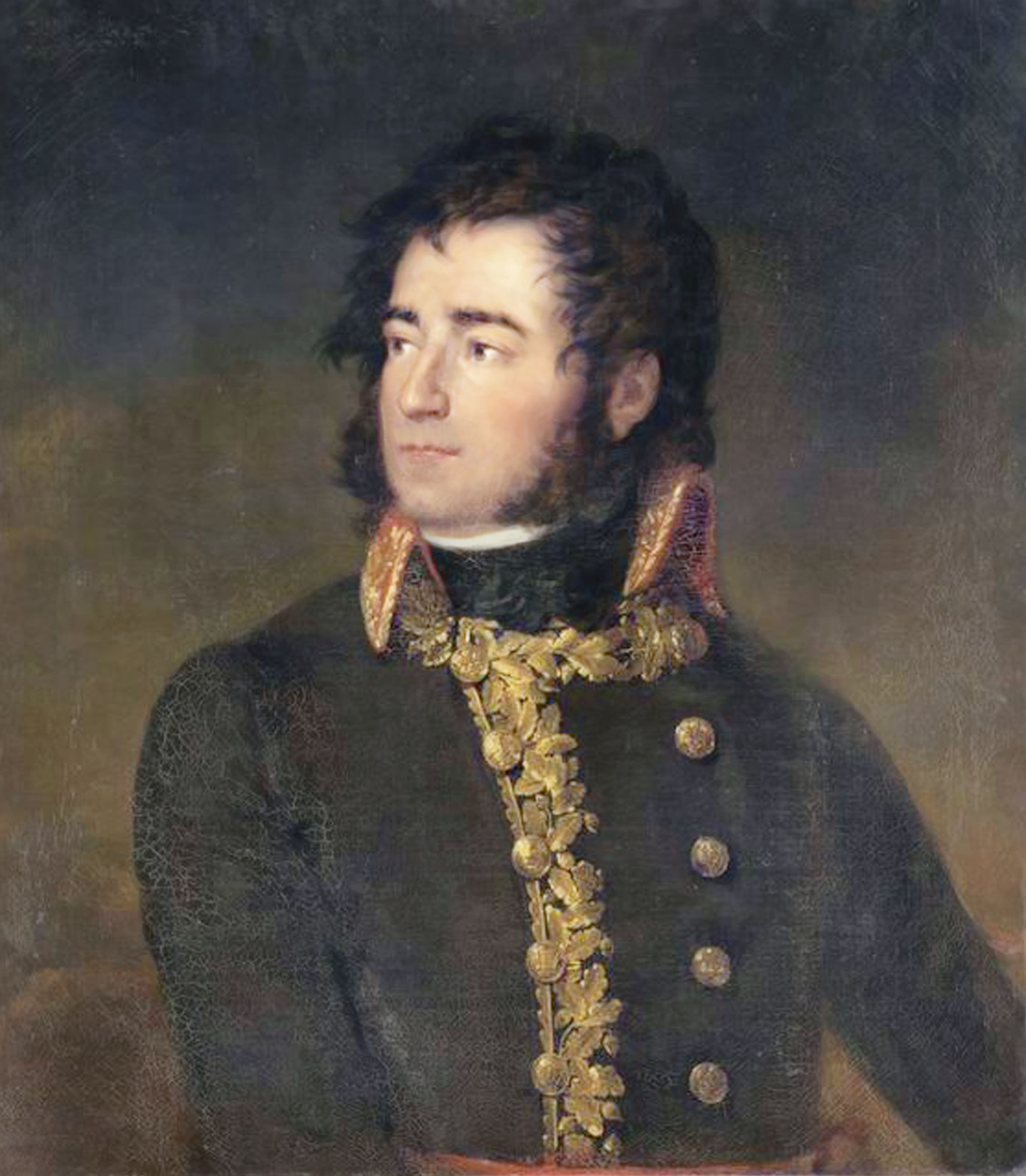
- General Jean-Antoine Marbot in 1795
- Born: 7 December 1754; Altillac, France
- Died: 19 April 1800 (aged 45) Genoa, Italy
- Allegiance: Kingdom of France; Kingdom of France; French Republic
- Rank: Général de division (Divisional general)
- Conflicts: War of the First Coalition; War of the Pyrenees; War of the Second Coalition; Italian campaign (DOW)
- Awards: Name inscribed on the Arc de Triomphe in Paris (Western pillar, 34th column)
- Children: Antoine Adolphe Marcelin Marbot, Maréchal de camp Jean-Baptiste Antoine Marcelin Marbot, Lieutenant-général
- Other work: Political offices: Deputy of Corrèze to the Legislative Assembly (1791–1792); Representative of Corrèze to the Council of Ancients (1795–1799); President of the Council of Ancients (1797, 1798); Military offices: Military governor of Paris (1799); Commander of the Army of Italy (1800)

Jean-Antoine Marbot (English: /mɑːrˈboʊ/ mar-BOH, French: [ʒɑ̃ ɑ̃twan maʁbo]; 7 December 1754 – 19 April 1800), also known to contemporaries as Antoine Marbot, was a French general and politician. He belongs to a family that has distinguished itself particularly in the career of arms, giving three generals to France in less than 50 years.

== Biography ==
=== Ancien Régime ===
Jean-Antoine Marbot was born into a family of military nobility in Altillac, in the ancient province of Quercy in southwestern France. His career began in the military household of the king of France in Versailles, where he joined the cavalry unit of the royal Gardes du Corps of King Louis XV, with the rank of second lieutenant. In 1781 he was promoted to the rank of captain of the dragoons and became aide-de-camp to Lieutenant-Général de Schomberg, inspector general of the cavalry, in 1782.

=== Legislative Assembly ===
Following of the ideas of Enlightenment, he retired from military service at the beginning of the Revolution and returned to his properties in Altillac. He was elected administrator of the department of Corrèze in 1790 and then deputy of this department to the Legislative Assembly on 3 September 1791 with 206 votes out of 361, where he sat in the majority. On 5 April 1792, he presented a report on the finances of the state in front of the assembly, and proposed a national loan plan, the purpose of which was to reduce the number of assignats in circulation to 12 million, so that acquirers of national property would have to pay in metallic values.

=== War of the Pyrenees ===
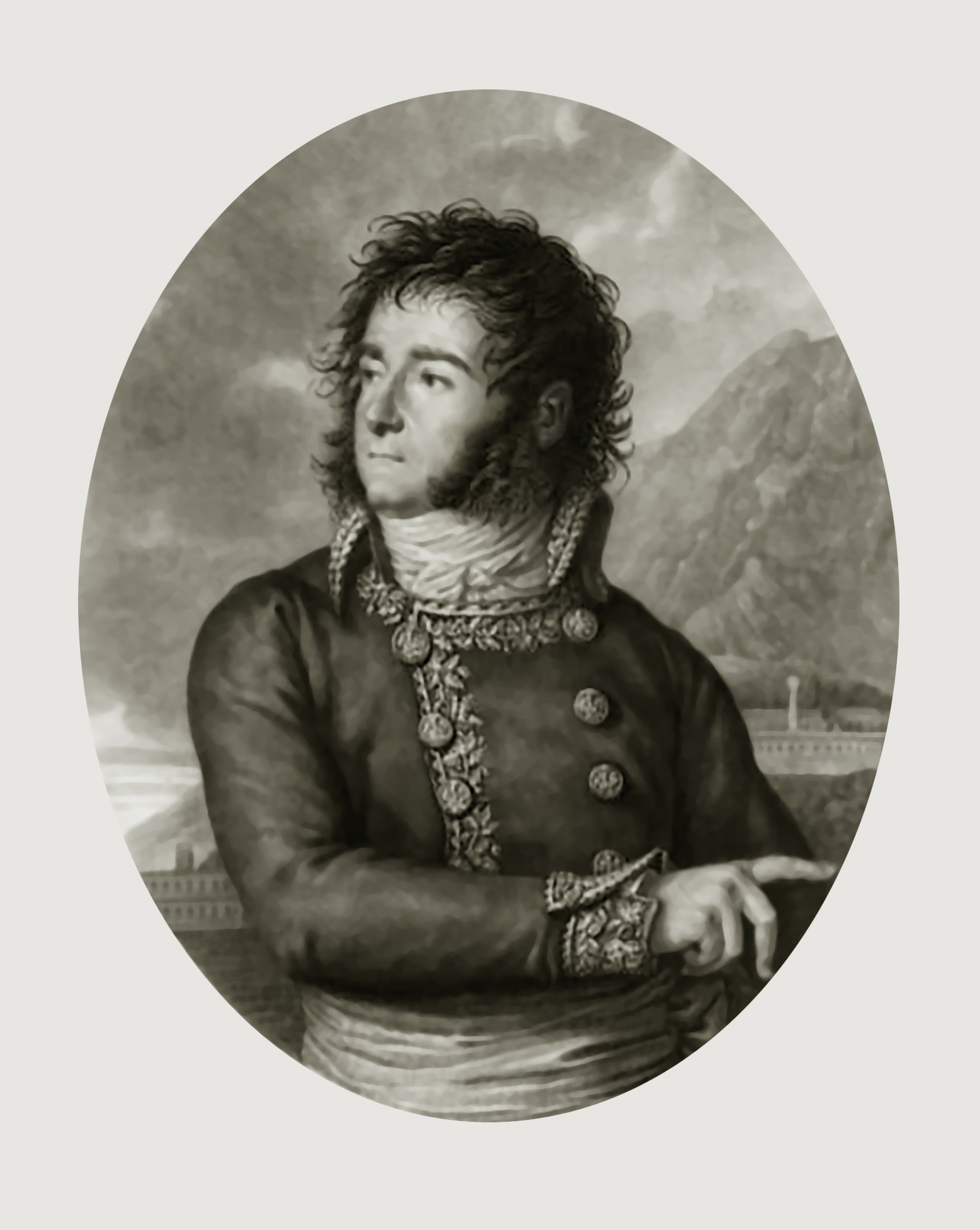
General Jean-Antoine Marbot

He reentered military service during the War of the Pyrenees against Spain with the rank of captain of the mountain chasseurs. On 30 August 1793, he was promoted to the rank of brigadier general and fought with the Army of the Eastern Pyrenees, distinguishing himself during the capture of Spanish Cerdanya under the orders of General Dagobert de Fontenille. He then joined the Army of the Western Pyrenees from 1794 to 1795, where he was promoted to the rank of divisional general. He won numerous victories against the enemy forces, particularly on 12 August 1794 at Sainte-Engrâce and Olloqui, on 4 September 1794 at Lescun, on 24–25 November 1794 at Orthez, and on 12 May 1796 during the attack on enemy positions between Glossua and Elgoibar, where he made many prisoners. On 9 June 1795 he was dismissed for political motives by représentants en mission, special envoys of the National Convention, before being definitively reinstated on 13 June of the same year.

=== Council of Ancients ===
Seal of the Council of Ancients

On 15 October 1795, he was elected Deputy of Corrèze to the Council of Ancients, the upper house of French legislature during the French First Republic, with 121 votes out of 236. He became opposed to the Clichy Club, which he accused of conspiring against the interest of the Republic and he subsequently approved the coup of 18 Fructidor (4 September 1797), led by Generals Napoleon Bonaparte and Pierre Augereau, the latter having been his protégé during the War of the Pyrenees. On 6 September 1797, he was elected president of the Council of Ancients. On 11 January 1798, he passed a proposal aiming to contain the uprising that was being ignited by émigrés in the county of Avignon, in the south of France. Re-elected president of the Council of Ancients on 19 June 1798, he delivered a commemorative speech during the celebrations of the 14th of July, and favoured decisive actions against the coalition powers at war with France. On 18 April 1799, he supported a bill for the conscription of two hundred thousand men for the army, opposing the system adopted by the Minister of the Interior, François de Neufchâteau.

=== Military governor of Paris ===
He was appointed military governor of Paris by the Minister of War, General Jean-Baptiste Bernadotte on 5 July 1799, replacing General Barthélemy Joubert at the head of the 17th Military Division stationed in Paris. After General Napoleon Bonaparte's return from the Egyptian campaign, he opposed the planned coup d'état, which was to overthrow the government of the Directory and replace it with a more autocratic Consulate. Its authors, led by Director Emmanuel Sieyès, and eventually joined by General Bonaparte, knew that they needed the support of the armed forces in Paris to pursue their scheme. Fearing its current commander's attachment to republican ideals, they offered him a new position in the leadership of the Army of Italy, which he accepted. After his resignation, the more favourable General François Lefebvre succeeded him as military governor of Paris.

=== Italian campaign ===
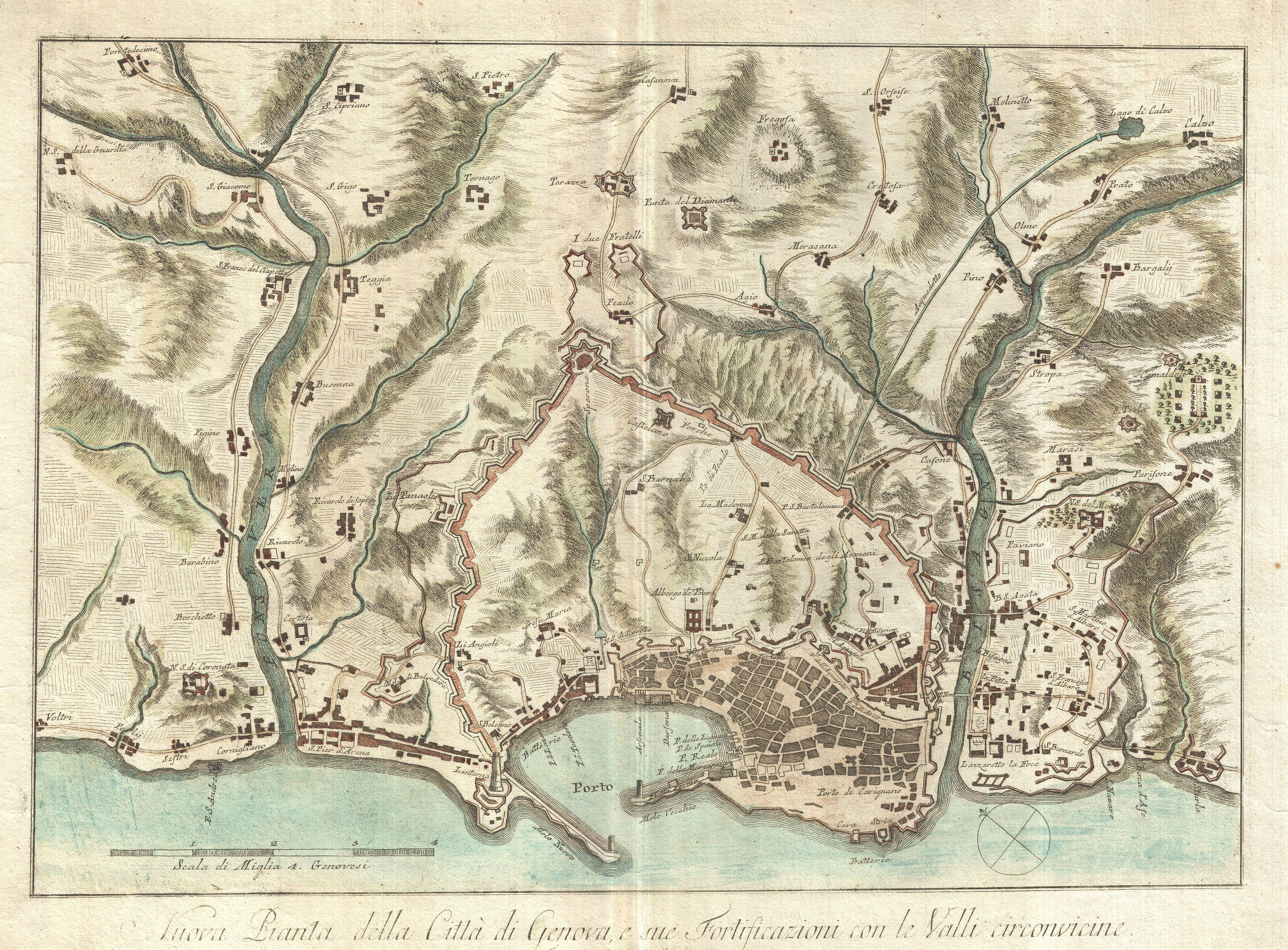
Plan of the fortifications of Genoa in 1800

Shortly before the coup of 18 Brumaire (9 November 1799), he was sent as divisional general to the Army of Italy, which was then under the command of General Jean-Étienne Championnet. After his death, he obtained the command of the Army of Italy until the arrival of General André Masséna. He commanded one of the divisions of the French forces fighting in Liguria, and was stationed in the city of Savona. The heights of the city were the subject of numerous battles, especially on 6 and 13 April 1800, as the Austrian troops were trying to make their way to the city of Genoa. He soon fell ill and had to be transported to Genoa to receive medical treatment. He died on 19 April 1800, during the Austrian siege of Genoa as a result of his wounds and of typhus. He was accompanied by his son, then Second-lieutenant and later General Marcellin Marbot, who also took part in the siege and described his father's last moments in his famous Memoirs.

== Family ==
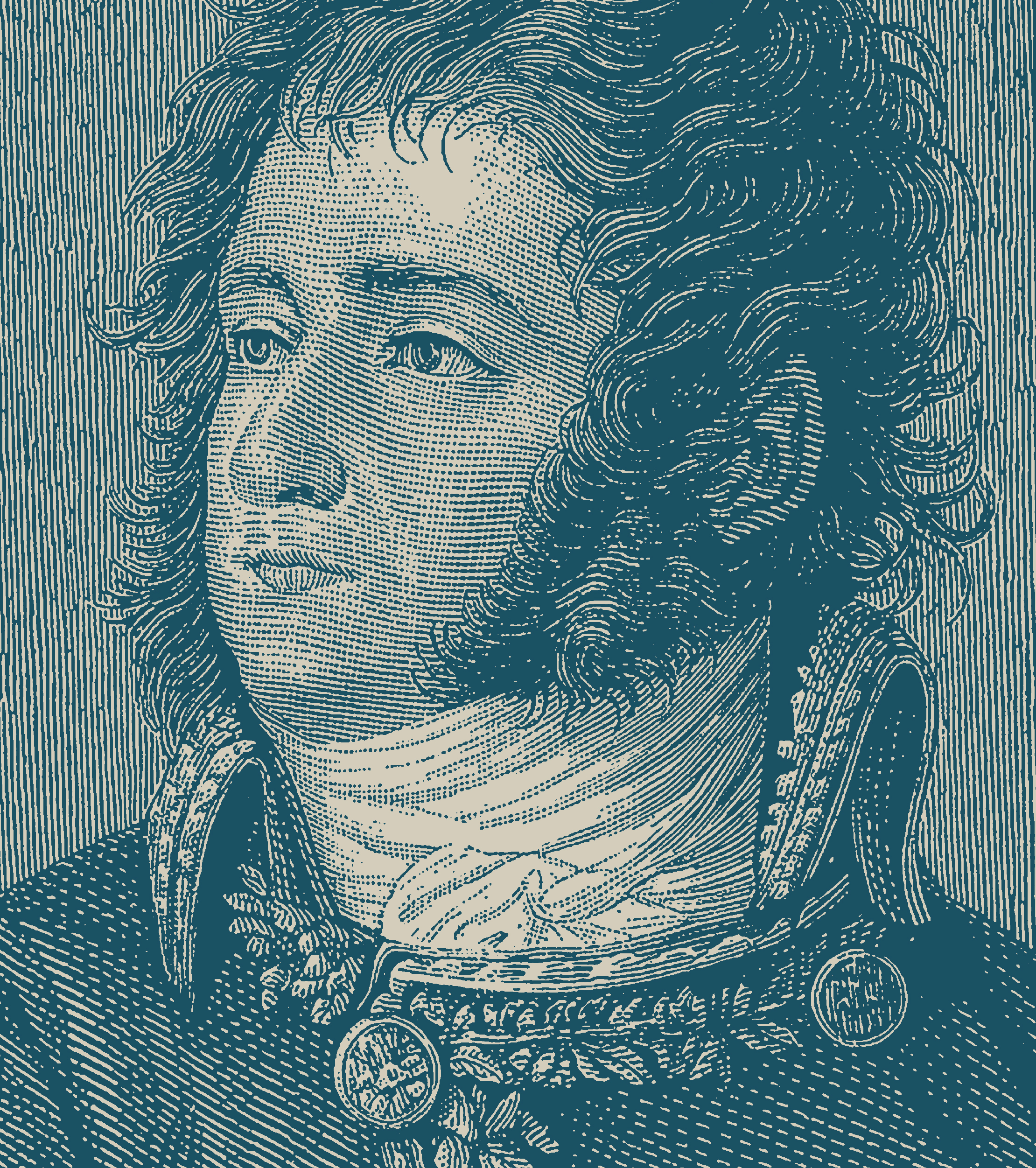
General Jean-Antoine Marbot

On 3 October 1776, he married Marie-Louise Certain du Puy (1756–1826), with whom he had four sons:

- Antoine Adolphe Marcelin, known as Adolphe (1781–1844): maréchal de camp (brigadier general) during the July Monarchy.
- Jean-Baptiste Antoine Marcelin, known as Marcellin (1782–1854): lieutenant-général (divisional general) during the July Monarchy, famous for his Memoirs depicting the Napoleonic age of warfare.
- Jean-François Théodore Xavier, known as Théodore (1785–1803): Died at the Prytanée national militaire from a hydrocution.
- Jean-Jacques Édouard Félix, known as Félix (1787–1805): Died at the École Spéciale Impériale Militaire from a septic infection after a duel.

His wife was related to François Certain de Canrobert, Marshal of France during the Second French Empire.

== Tribute ==
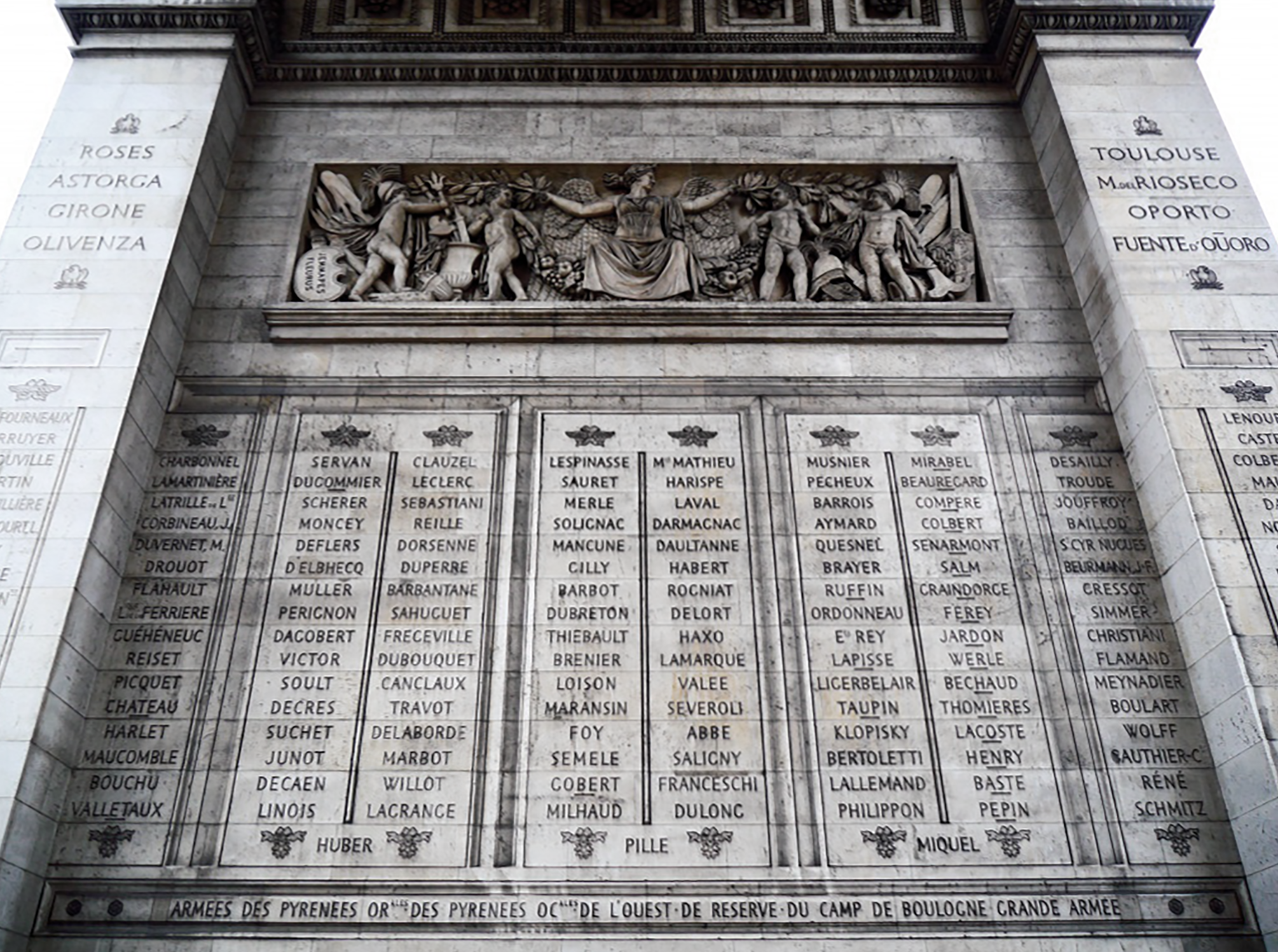
The name of General Jean-Antoine Marbot on the Arc de Triomphe in Paris

The name of General Jean-Antoine Marbot is inscribed on the western pillar, 34th column, of the Arc de Triomphe in Paris. Although he lost his life during the siege of Genoa, he is not considered to have fallen in combat. For this reason, his name is not underlined.

The Avenue des Généraux Marbot in Altillac is also named after him.

== See also ==
- Names inscribed on the Arc de Triomphe in Paris
- Generals of the Army of the Western Pyrenees
- Presidents of the Council of Ancients
- Presidents of the Senate of France
- Marbot family
- Military governors of Paris
- Commanders of the Army of Italy

Political offices
Preceded by André-Daniel Laffon de Ladebat	President of the Council of Ancients; 1797	Succeeded by Emmanuel Crétet
Preceded by Claude Ambroise Régnier	President of the Council of Ancients; 1798	Succeeded by Étienne Maynaud de Bizefranc de Laveaux
Military offices
Preceded by Barthélemy Catherine Joubert	Military governor of Paris; 1799	Succeeded by François Joseph Lefebvre
Preceded by Louis-Gabriel Suchet	Commander of the Army of Italy; 1800	Succeeded by André Masséna
