= Joseph-Marie, comte Portalis =

French diplomat and statesman

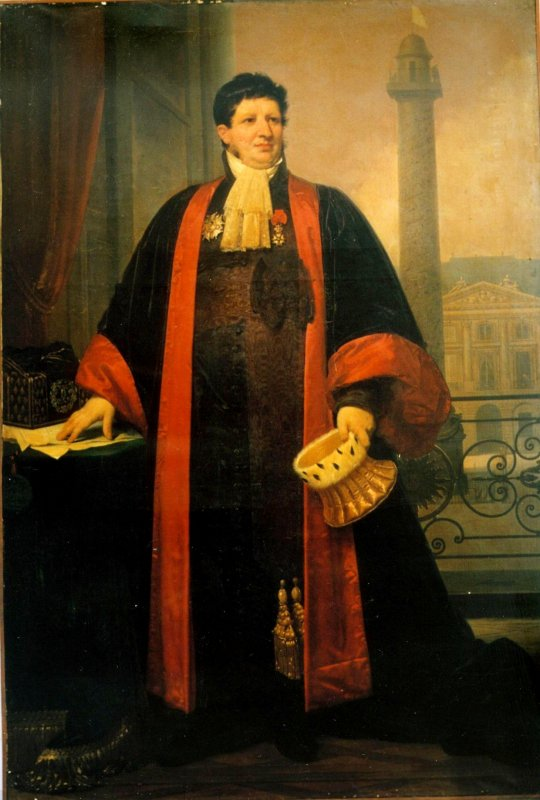
Joseph-Marie Portalis as vice-president of French Supreme Court (1820s)

Joseph-Marie, comte Portalis (19 February 1778, Aix-en-Provence – 5 August 1858) was a French diplomat and statesman.

He was the son of the jurist Jean-Étienne-Marie Portalis. He entered the diplomatic service, and obtaining the favour of Louis XVIII filled many important offices. He was Minister of Justice from 1821 to 1828, first president of the court of cassation, minister for foreign affairs (1829), and in 1851 a member of the senate.

Political offices
Preceded by Pierre-Denis, Comte de Peyronnet	Minister of Justice; 1821–1828	Succeeded by Pierre Bordeau
