= Jean Dusaulx =

French politician (1728–1799)

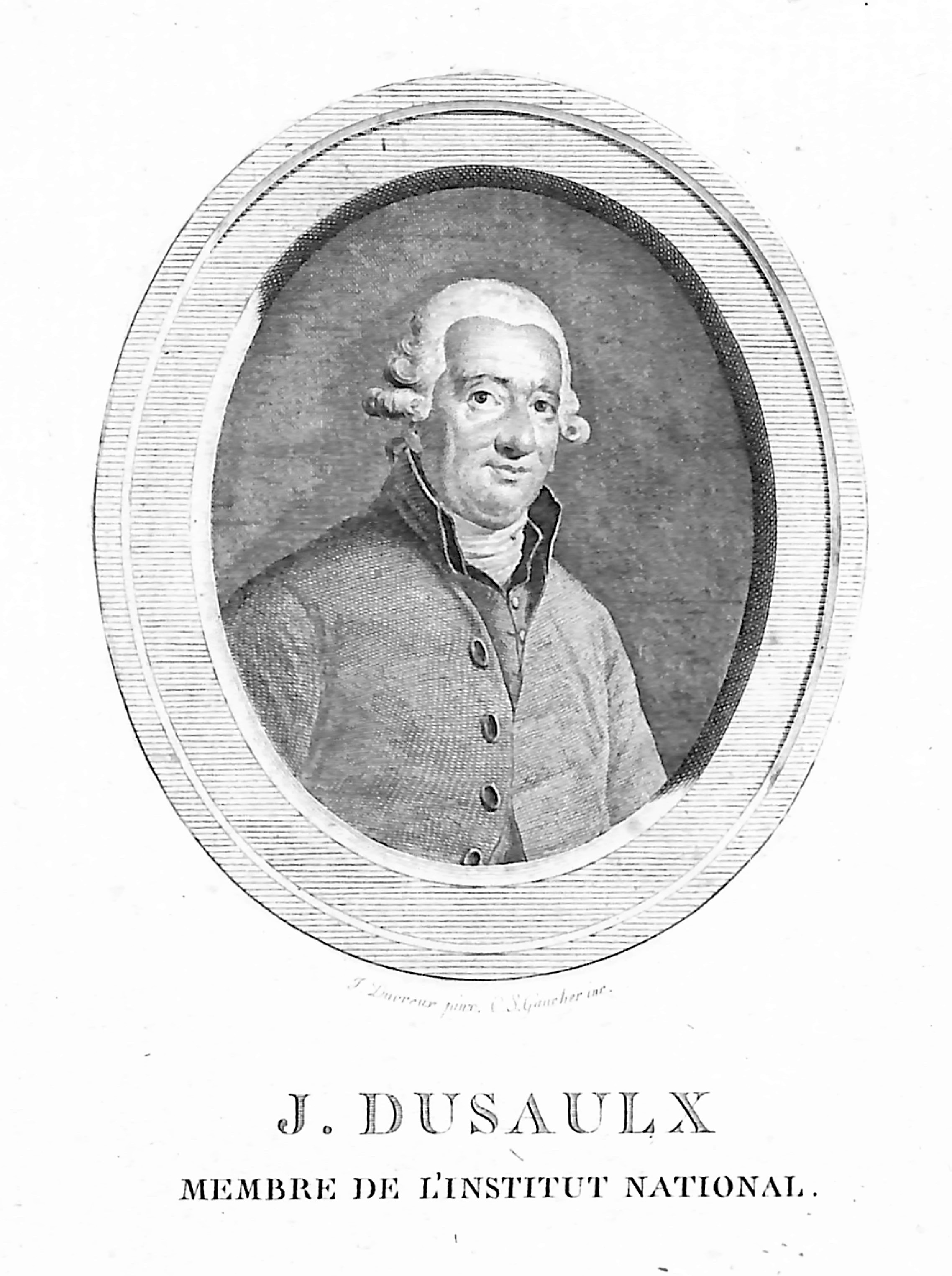
- Portrait of Jean Dussaulx or Dusaulx by Gaucher from Ducreux, 1749
- Born: 28 December 1728; Chartres
- Died: 16 March 1799; Paris
- Occupations: Jurist, writer, member of parliament

Jean-Joseph Dusaulx, (28 December 1728, in Chartres – 16 March 1799, in Paris) was a French politician during the French Revolution. He was friendly with Jean Sylvain Bailly, the mayor. In February 1792 he was elected as a member of the "Conseil Général" of the Paris Commune. He denounced the September Massacres, and voted against the execution of Louis XVI. In Spring 1793 was attacked by Billaud-Varenne, arrested, but saved by Marat, as being too old to become dangerous. In 1795 he was elected in the upper house of parliament, the Council of Ancients.

== Works ==
Dusaulx was a man of letters, a lover of the works by Jean-Jacques Rousseau, corresponded and organized a dinner for him where the famous author read his Confessions for the audience (1770-1771).

Dusaulx is known for his translations of Satires (Juvenal) (1770), and he wrote passionate about gambling (1775, 1779) and travelling and going into the mountains (1788). As a librarian of the Arsenal, he published a history on the Storming of the Bastille (1790). In 1798 he published "De mes rapports avec J. J. Rousseau".
