= Jacques Antoine Creuzé-Latouche =

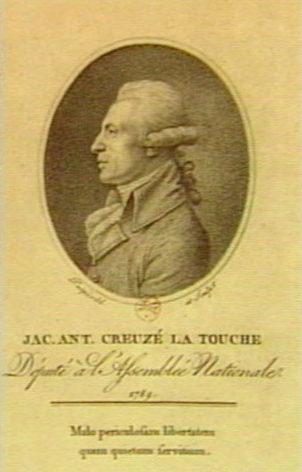
- Born: 18 September 1749; Châtellerault, Vienne, France
- Died: 23 October 1800 (aged 51); Paris, France
- Occupations: Lawyer, politician
- Known for: Member of the National Convention

Jacques Antoine Creuzé-Latouche (18 September 1749 – 23 October 1800) was a French lawyer, Jacobin, and member of the National Convention of France during the French Revolution.

== Early years ==
Jacques Antoine Creuzé-Latouche was born at Châtellerault, Vienne, on 18 September 1749 to a Poitevin family of magistrates. He qualified as a lawyer in Poitiers and practiced at the bar in Paris. He spent some time in Switzerland before returning to Châtellerault in 1784 where he bought the office of lieutenant general of the sénéchaussée of Châtellerault. In 1787 he sat in the assembly of the province of Poitou.

== Deputy ==
On 31 March 1789 Creuzé-Latouche was elected deputy to represent the third estate of Châtellerault in the Estates-General of 1789. He was not active in the tribune but was active in committee work. He specialized in matters of finance and economics. As a member of the committee on coins he was a strong defender of the assignat, whose fate he linked to that of the French Revolution. After the National Constituent Assembly formed on 9 July 1789 Creuzé-Latouche became judge of the High Court of Orleans, while continuing to play an active role in the Châtellerault Jacobin Society. In 1790 he joined the Jacobin club in Paris.

On 12 April 1791 Creuzé-Latouche was elected to the Court of Cassation by his department. He left the Jacobin club during the split in July 1791 between the Feuillants and the radicals, then rejoined at the end of July 1791. He was vocal in opposing refractory priests. On 5 March 1792 he voted to requisition objects of worship made of precious metals so they could be used to make coins and ingots.

On 5 September 1792 Creuzé-Latouche was elected to represent the department of Vienne in the National Convention by 177 out of 311 votes. He sat with the Girondists in the Convention. He advocated free trade in food in 1792, and pushed this position more vigorously in the spring in 1793. His strong support for liberalizing the grain trade earned him a reputation as a "physiocratic sympathizer". He was often described as belonging to the Plain. Due to his positions on free trade and his collaboration with several periodicals associated with Jean Marie Roland and Jacques Pierre Brissot he was clearly one of the Girondins. At the trial of King Louis XVI he voted against the appeal to the people, for detention followed by banishment and then for suspension.

== Later career ==
Due to Creuzé-Latouche's relative lack of political activity he was not included in the arrests that followed the fall of the Gironde in the insurrection of 31 May – 2 June 1793. He gave protection in his home to the daughter of Roland. He stayed away from politics until the Thermidorian Reaction of 27 July 1794. He was a supporter of the new census system, which he helped implement as a member of the committee of eleven set up to revise the constitution. In Germinal, year 3, he sat on the Committee of Public Safety. On 31 January 1795 Creuzé-Latouche spoke in the National Convention calling for the addition of a chair in political economy in the newly established École Normale. The measure was approved with little debate.

On 21 Vendémiaire, year IV, Creuzé-Latouche was appointed to the Council of Ancients, where he played an important role in the fight against the clergy. He said "the priests were the instigators of all evil and all the crimes that had desolated the earth. " He was firmly opposed to the royalists and supported the coup of 18 Fructidor (4 September 1797) in which the French Directory took power. He was elected to the Council of Five Hundred in Prairial, year VI, and was appointed president. Creuzé-Latouche supported Napoleon's coup on 9 November 1799, and was appointed to the Senate in Nivôse, year VIII. He was also a member of the Institute. He died in Paris on 23 October 1800.

== Works ==
- Description topographique du district de Châtellerault (1790)
- De la tolérance philosophique et de l'intolérance religieuse (1797)
- Réflexions sur la vie champêtre
