= Jean-Pierre Lacombe-Saint-Michel =

French Army officer (1751–1812)

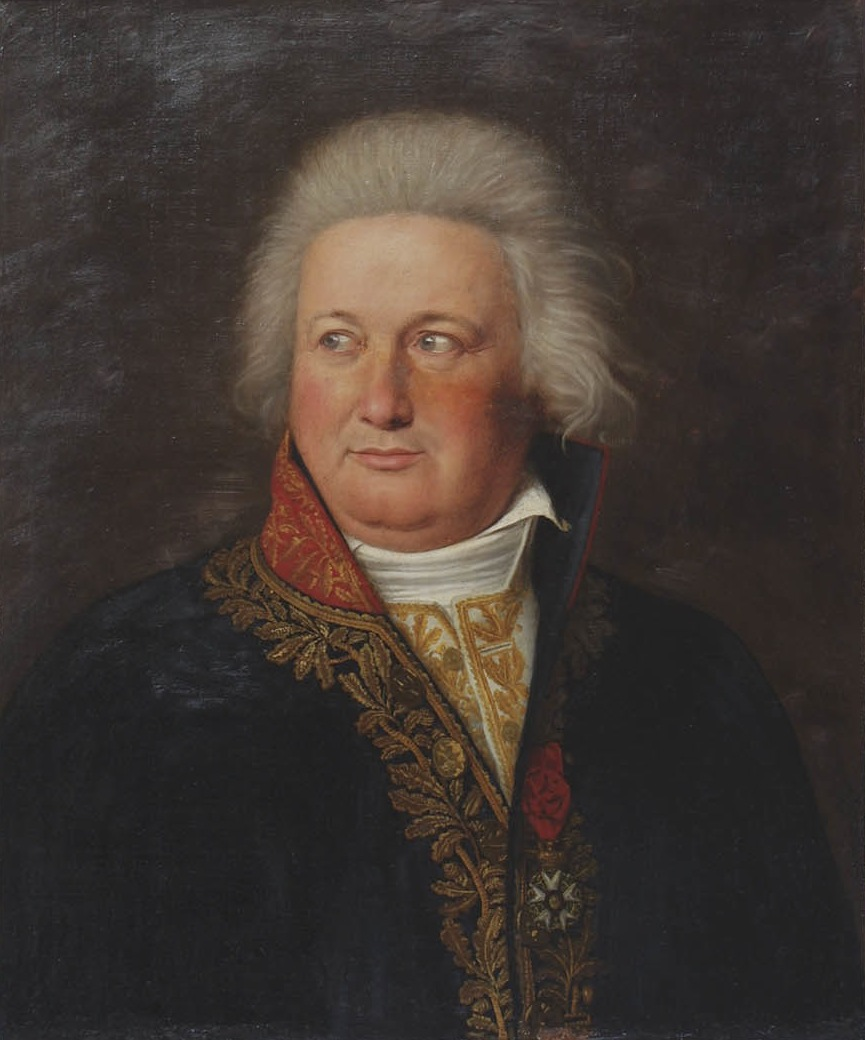
1850 portrait of Lacombe-Saint-Michel by Eugène Maurin

Divisional-General Jean-Pierre Lacombe-Saint-Michel (5 March 1751 – 27 January 1812) was a French Army officer who served in the French Revolutionary and Napoleonic Wars. He appeared as a character in Les Géorgiques by the novelist Claude Simon, his direct descendant. During the French Revolution, Lacombe-Saint-Michel protected the father of Honoré de Balzac.

== French Revolution ==
Starting as an artillery cadet in 1765, Jean-Pierre Lacombe-Saint-Michel became a second lieutenant in the Toul regiment in 1767, gunnery captain in 1779, and mortar captain in 1786. Pierre Choderlos de Laclos was his captain-major at this time. In 1789, he took part in the storming of the Bastille, but as marshal de Broglie did not have confidence in him he was sent back to Tarn, where he was elected to an administrative post. In 1782 he married Marie Anne d’Hasselaër, by whom he had a son. His first wife died in January 1790.

He was first a member of the military committee of the Assembly, and was then re-elected as a deputy to the National. Convention. He was sent to Savoy, together with Thomas-Augustin de Gasparin and Edmond Louis Alexis Dubois-Crancé to dismiss General Anne-Pierre, marquis de Montesquiou-Fézensac. On his return, he voted for the death of the king (though later in 1793 he remarried, to Marie Micoud, a courageous woman who had tried to save the king from the guillotine and had been imprisoned at the beginning of the year).

Lacombe-Saint-Michel was then sent to Corsica, where he arrived on 6 April 1793 and defeated Pasquale Paoli at the Battle of Farinole on 15 November. Wounded in the battle, Lacombe-Saint-Michel was promoted to brigadier general on 17 November. He was part of the Army of the North when Maximilien Robespierre fell from power. On 31 July 1793, Lacombe-Saint-Michel wrote to the Committee of Public Safety: "By attacking the treacherous coalition that I will search out Robespierre’s accomplices." In February 1794, British forces invaded Corsica, besieging Bastia on 4 April. Lacombe-Saint-Michel, who commanded the Bastia garrison, slipped past the British on 12 May and made his way to France to inform the National Convention of the invasion's progress; the town fell ten days later. On his return to Paris in February 1795, he became a member of the Committee himself.

== Directory ==
He was elected to the Council of Ancients by Tarn, as well as by Nord and Orne. He supported the Directory and the Coup of 18 Fructidor (4 September 1797). With the rank of divisional general when he completed his term on the Council on 13 February 1798, Lacombe-Saint-Michel was sent to Naples, but spoke in such an undiplomatic and pro-Republican way to Ferdinand I of the Two Sicilies that he was asked to leave the kingdom. His ship was seized by pirates from Tunis, but Hammuda Pasha set him free. On his return to France in January 1799, he was given command of the artillery in the Army of the Rhine.

== Consulate and Empire ==
From 1800 to 1805 Napoleon placed him in charge of artillery for the Army of Italy. He was made Grand Officer of the Legion of Honour on 27 July 1808. He saw further action in Hannover and Catalonia, where he commanded the 10th division before being appointed governor of Barcelona in 1810. During his brief term of office he established a Commission for the Arts and Sciences to assemble a library of all the collections from religious houses that had been suppressed. In August 1810 poor health ended his career, after seventeen campaigns, and he was replaced as governor by David-Maurice-Joseph Mathieu de La Redorte.
