= Acte de déchéance de l'Empereur =

1814 law deposing Napoleon I as Emperor of France

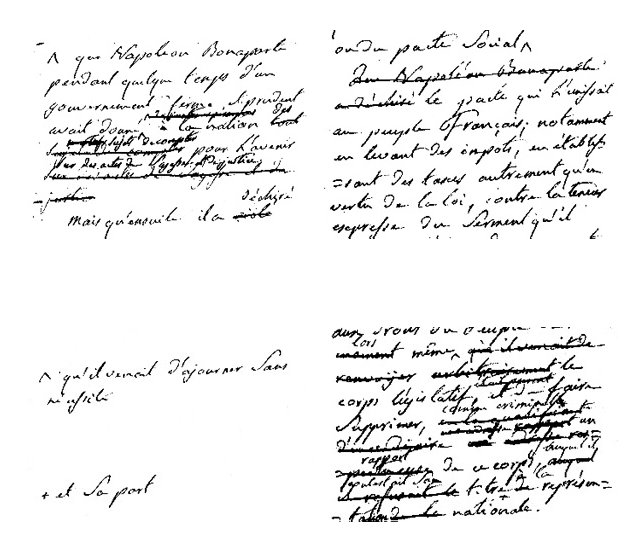
Manuscript project of the Acte de déchéance de l'Empereur

The Acte de déchéance de l'Empereur (from French: "Emperor's Demise Act") was a law passed by the Sénat conservateur on 2 April 1814, which deposed Napoleon I as Emperor of the French.

== Background ==
Since the French Revolution had deposed Louis XVI, France had been almost constantly at war with most of Europe. Chronic political instability and the constant rumbles of war created a favourable terrain for a military coup, which General Bonaparte exploited on 18 Brumaire, establishing the French Consulate in the Constitution of the Year VIII, led by an equilateral triumvirate. Two years later, the Constitution was amended into the Constitution of the Year X, making Bonaparte First Consul for life. Finally, on 18 May 1804, the Sénat conservateur passed the Constitution of the Year XII. The document converted the republic into a hereditary empire, and Bonaparte declared himself "Napoléon I, Emperor of the French". Napoleon was crowned emperor on 2 December 1804.

A series of Napoleon's disasters and conflicts like the Peninsular War, the War of the Sixth Coalition, and the French invasion of Russia led to the near obliteration of the once overwhelming Grande Armée. By February 1814, the French Army was so depleted that, even after winning every battle of the Six Days' Campaign, it could not stop the march of the Allies on French soil on its route on Paris.

The Allies arrived at the outskirts of Paris in late March, and Talleyrand maneuvered to take upon himself to negotiate the capitulation of Marmont, who defended the capital. On 31 March, Talleyrand dined at his hotel with Frederick William III of Prussia and Alexander I of Russia, and pleaded for a Bourbon restoration, arguing that the Senate would support the plan.

== Act ==
On 1 April 1814, the Sénat conservateur elected Talleyrand chief of a five-member provisionary government.

The next morning, Talleyrand and Barthélemy, president of the Senate, proposed a motion to depose Napoléon and the House of Bonaparte, and call the Count of Provence to the throne as King Louis XVIII.

On 3 April, the Senate voted a text detailing its reasons for ousting Napoléon. It charged the emperor with numerous violations of the Constitution of the Year XII, which it had itself approved over the years. The minutes of the meeting were published in Le Moniteur Universel of 4 April.

The final paragraph read:

The Senate declares and decrees the following:

Article 1. Napoleon Bonaparte is deposed from the throne and the right of hereditary succession established in his family is abolished.

2. The French people and the army are released from the oath of allegiance to Napoleon Bonaparte.

3. This decree shall be transmitted by message to the Provisional Government of France, sent immediately to all departments and armies, and proclaimed without delay in all districts of the capital.

== Aftermath ==
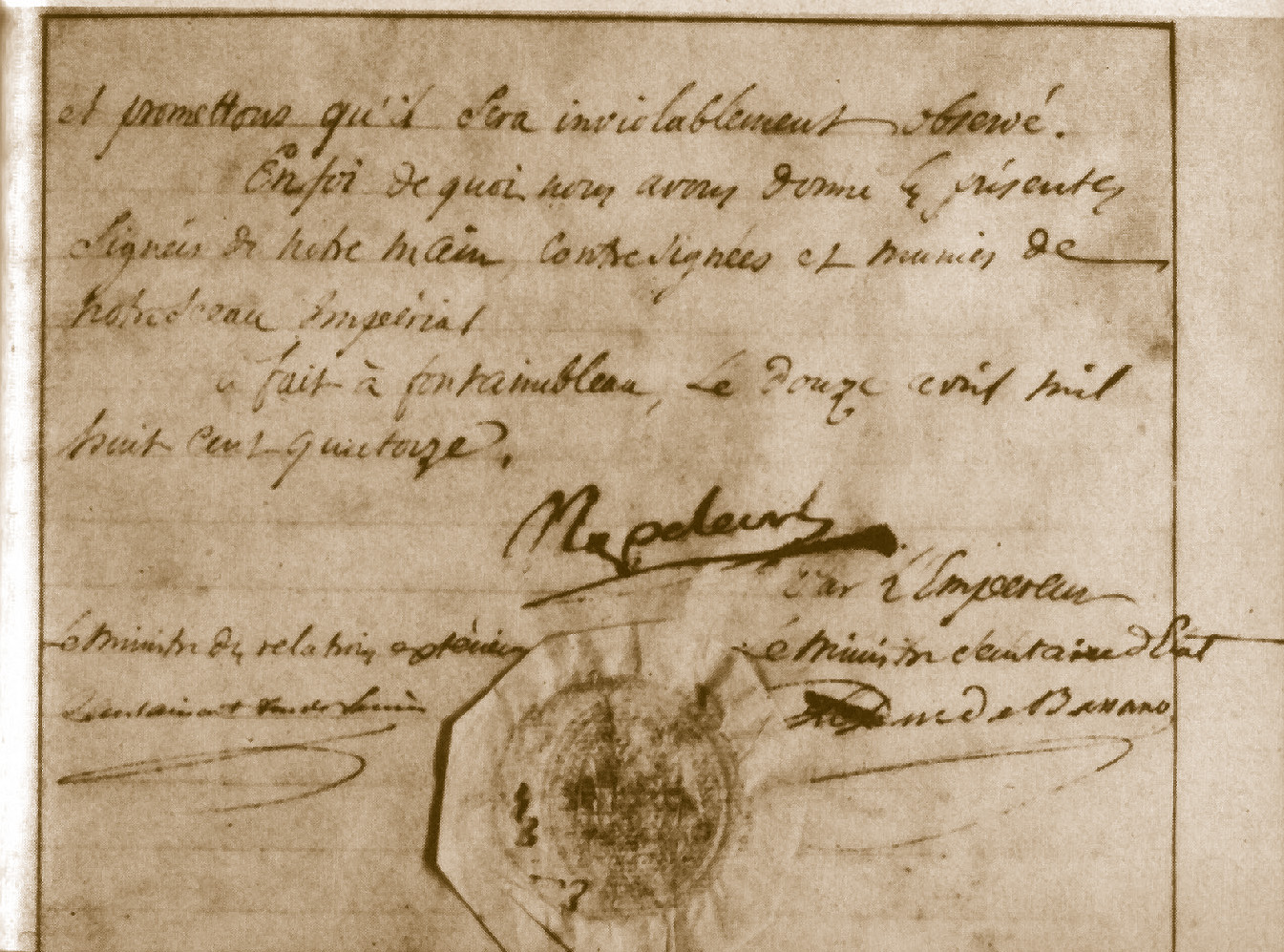
Abdication of Napoléon

On 11 April, after attempting to put his son on the throne, Napoléon abdicated unconditionally. The Allies allowed him to keep his title of Emperor, but exiled him to Elba. Napoléon attempted to return to power on 26 February 1815, leading to the Hundred Days. He was defeated at the Battle of Waterloo and imprisoned to the remote rock of Saint Helena for life.

In the following years, the Acte de déchéance de l'Empereur served as a litmus test of allegiance to the House of Bourbon.
