= Charter of 1814 =

French constitutional royal charter

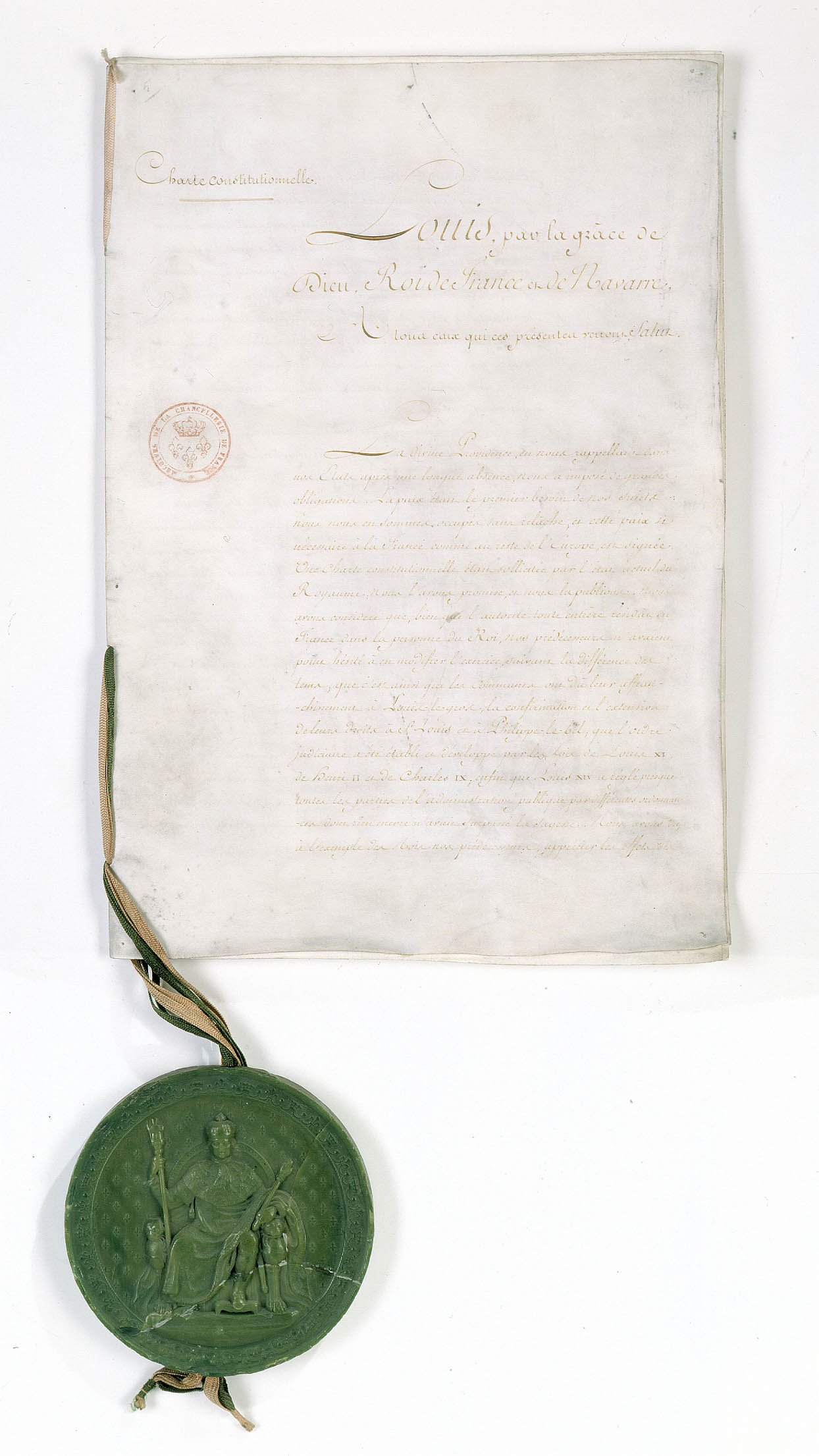
- Charter of 1814.

Overview
- Original title: (in French) Charte constitutionnelle du 4 juin 1814
- Jurisdiction: France
- Ratified: 4 June 1814
- System: Unitary semi-constitutional monarchy
- Chambers: Bicameral (Chamber of Peers and Chamber of Deputies)
- Executive: Monarch
- Supersedes: Constitution of the Year XII
- Superseded by: Charter of 1815; Charter of 1830

The French Charter of 1814 was a constitutional text granted by King Louis XVIII shortly after the Bourbon Restoration, in the form of a royal charter. The Congress of Vienna demanded that Louis bring in a constitution of some form before he was restored. After refusing the proposed constitution, the Constitution sénatoriale, set forth on 6 April 1814 by the provisional government and the Sénat conservateur ("Conservative Senate"), Louis Stanislas Xavier, count of Provence, bestowed a different constitutional Charter, on 4 June 1814. With the Congress of Vienna's demands met, the count of Provence was officially named Louis XVIII, and the monarchy was restored.

The Charter presents itself as a text of compromise, possibly of forgiveness, preserving the numerous acquisitions from the French Revolution and the Empire, whilst restoring the dynasty of the Bourbons. Its title as ‘constitutional Charter’ acts as evidence of compromise, the term ‘charter’ as reference to the Ancien Régime (“old rule”) and ‘constitutional’ indicates revolutionary intent. However, the Charter establishes a limited monarchy, as opposed to a constitutional monarchy, implementing a regime dominated by the King himself, declaring him as Head of State.

== Nature of the charter ==

A charter is a document defining the responsibilities of actors of the French state (the king and the two chambers).

In his Souvenirs de 1814, Louis-Philippe claimed that Louis XVIII did not conceive the charter as a new fundamental law of the French Kingdom – for those were still in place and could not be changed – but rather as a document stating the replacement of the Estates General and Parliaments by two Chambers, and defining the new responsibilities of these two Chambers.

== Drafting committee ==
On 18 May 1814, Louis XVIII created a drafting committee, nominating its twenty- two members. Wary of Talleyrand he decided not to include him, even though the latter played a key role during the constitution of 6 April.

In this commission, chaired by the chancellor Dambray, there were:

- Three royal commissioners: Montesquiou, Ferrand and Beugnot;
- Nine senators: Barbé-Marbois, Barthélemy, Boissy d’Anglas, Fontanes, Garnier, Pastoret, Huguet de Sémonville, Sérurier and Vimar;
- Nine members of the "Corps législatif": Blanquart de Bailleul, Chauvin de Bois-Savary, Chabaud-Latour, Clausel de Coussergues, Duchesnes de Gillevoisin, Faget de Baure, Faulcon, Lainé and Perrée-Duhamel.

On 22 May, the commission held its first meeting at Dambray's which lasted for six days. On 26 May, the commission offered its draft to the private counsel which approved it.

== Public law of the French ==
The opening twelve articles of the Charter are analogous to a "Bill of Rights". They contained such measures as a declaration of equality before the law, due process rights, religious toleration, freedom of the press, protection of private property, and abolition of conscription. These principles, together with the retention of the Napoleonic Code, represent some of the permanent gains of the French Revolution.

Nevertheless, the concept of the judicial review of the constitutionality of legislation was undeveloped, and it was the responsibility of the legislature, not the courts, to defend these rights. Freedom of the press, in particular, was subsequently restricted by harsh press censorship laws, which were deemed to violate the spirit of the charter.

Moreover, religious toleration was limited by the special provision made for the Catholic Church as the official state religion.

== Contents of the Charter ==
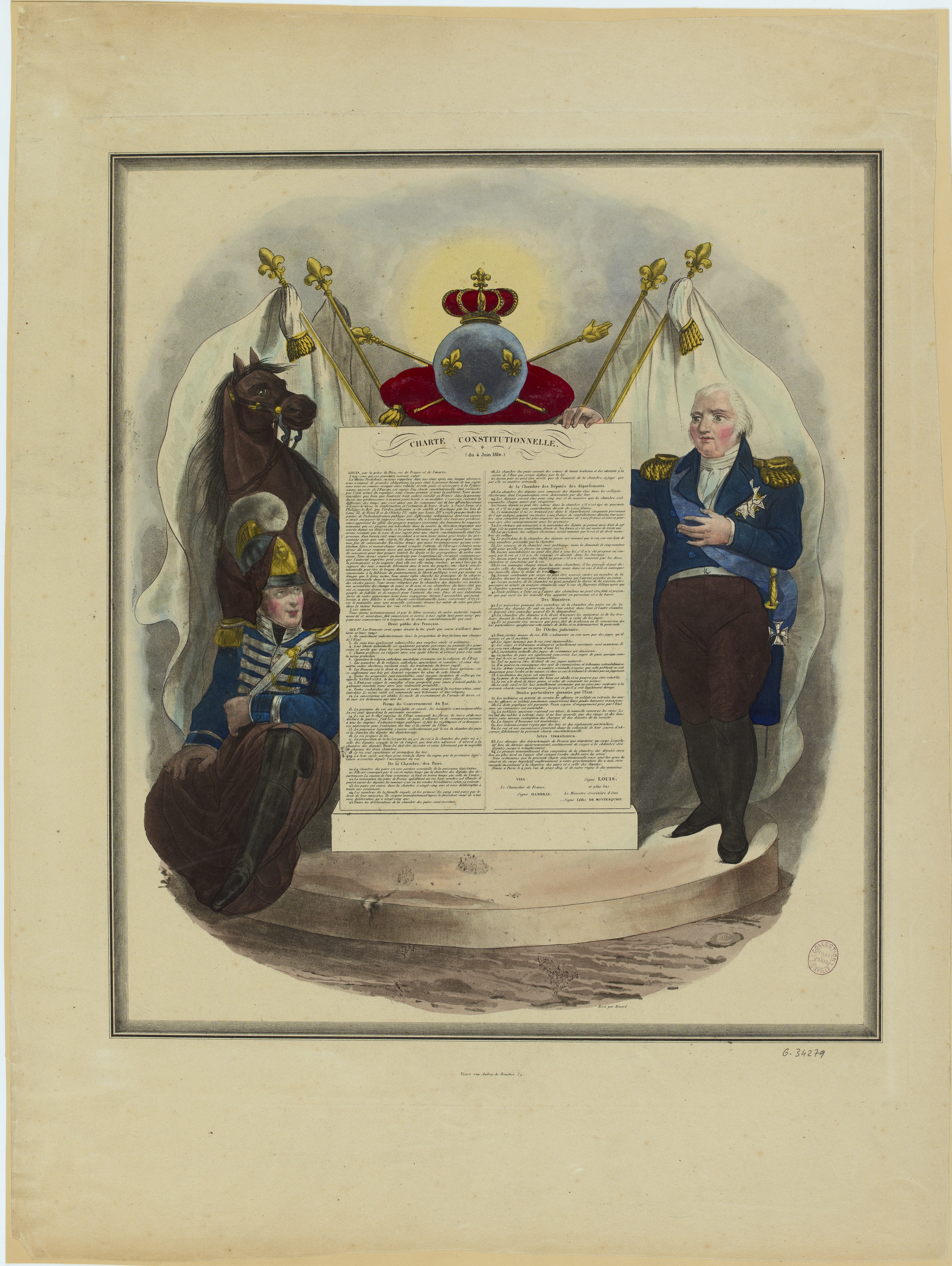
Charter of 1814 (1814 lithographic impression).

- Guarantee of individual rights, property rights, freedom of the press and freedom of expression, religious freedom (i.e. Catholicism is declared the state religion)
- Conscription is abolished
- The sale of national goods is not challenged, only remaining goods are handed over to former emigrants
- The King has executive power (right to peace and war, alliances, appointment to professional posts). Article 14 gives the King the right to legislate by ordinance ‘for the execution of laws and the security of the State’. He is the head of the armies. Louis XVIII, ‘sovereign by the grace of God’, initiates laws and promulgates them. He appoints the ministers, who are accountable to him alone, but can be indicted before the Chamber of Deputies. Ministers may be chosen from among the members of two chambers
- Legislative power is divided between the King, who alone initiates laws, and two chambers. The Chamber of Peers, made up of nobles, is appointed by the King (for life and on a hereditary basis) and the Chamber of Deputies is elected by selective suffrage (deputies pay more than 1,000 francs in direct taxes, voters more than 300), renewable by one-fifth each year. The Chamber of Deputies may be dissolved by the King. The Chambers progressively obtain the right of address and the capacity to put questions to the government and thus put it in difficulty, without this necessarily leading to its resignation
- Judicial power is given to judges appointed by the King and is irremovable; the institution of the jury is confirmed. All the codes remain in force. The King retains significant judicial power
- The former pre-revolutionary nobility is restored in its titles, but the imperial nobility retains its titles. The nobility confers "no exemption from the duties and obligations of society"
- The right to suffrage is granted to men of at least 30 years of age and tax (300 French francs of direct contributions) is imposed on them because there was no question at the time of establishing universal suffrage, the electorate being considered as a social function. At the request of the liberals, selective suffrage is adopted. This is granted to men of at least 40 years of age, who are charged 1,000 French francs of direct tax. Given these conditions, the politically active citizens amount to 100,000 voters and 15,000 eligibles
- The administrative structures put in place by the Revolution and the Empire are massively preserved within the framework of a strict policy of centralisation of powers (mayors, general councillors and district councillors are appointed by the government or the State representatives)

== The King and his Ministers ==
The King occupied a central position under the Charter of 1814.

The Charter declared that the king was Head of State and chief executive: the King appointed public officials, issued the ordinances and regulations necessary "for the execution of the laws and the security of the state", commanded the army and navy, declared war, and made "treaties of peace, alliance and commerce" (Articles 13 and 14).

In addition, the King had great influence over the legislative power, since he possessed the sole right to present draft laws to Parliament (Article 16), and the right to grant or withhold assent to laws passed by the Parliament (Article 20). The King summoned and prorogued Parliament and had the right to dissolve the Chamber of Deputies and call new elections (Article 50). The King also appointed the members of the House of Peers (Article 27).

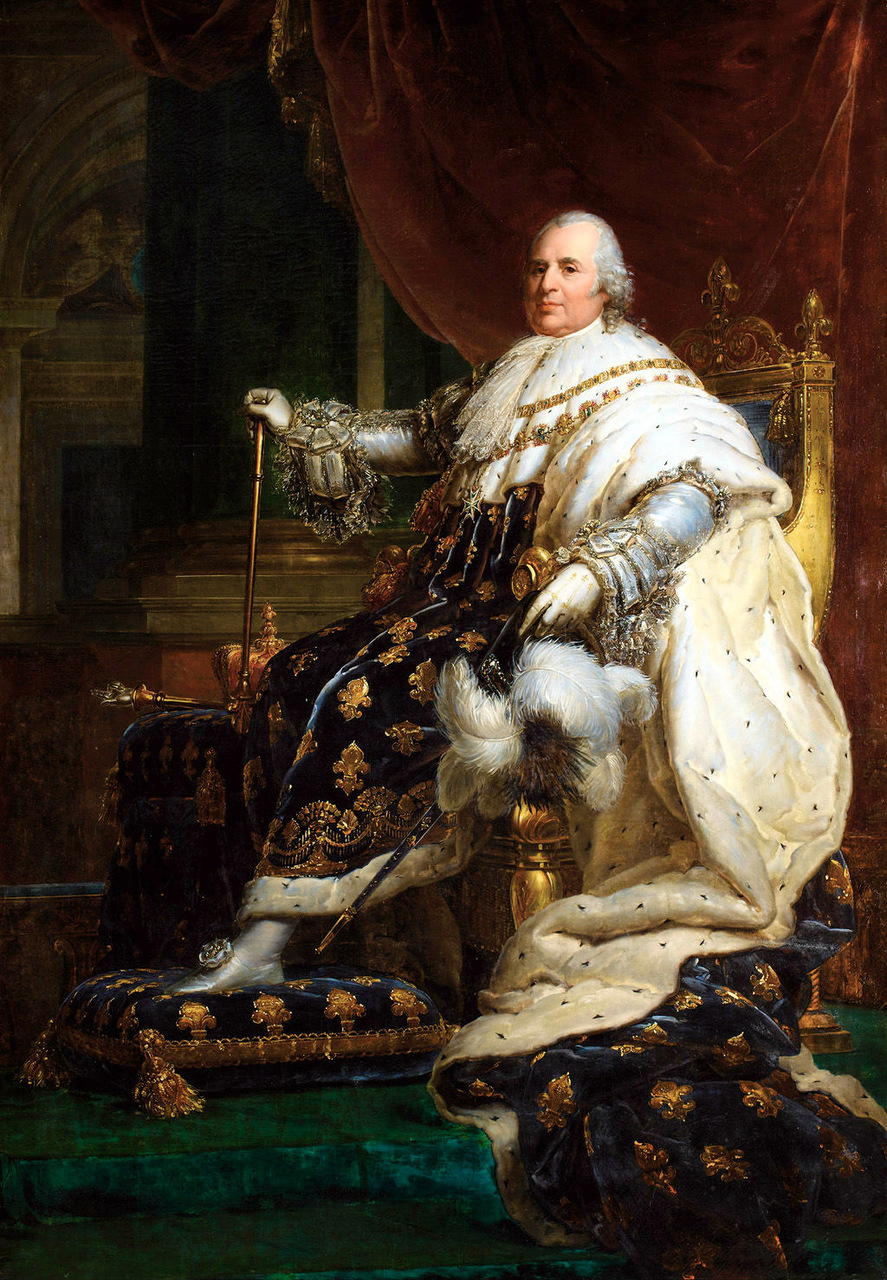
Portrait of Louis XVIII by François Gérard, 1814

In the judicial field, the King appointed judges (Article 57) and had the power of pardon (Article 67).

== The Chambers ==
In imitation of the British model, the Charter of 1814 established a bicameral legislature, consisting of a Chamber of Deputies and a Chamber of Peers.

The Chamber of Deputies was elected, but with a high tax qualification. The election took place in two stages, with voters choosing members of Electoral Colleges, who in turn elected Deputies. Members of Electoral Colleges had to pay 300 francs a year in direct taxes (Article 40), while Deputies themselves had to pay a direct tax of 1000 Francs a year. As taxes were mainly levied on landed wealth, this restricted the Chamber of Deputies to a very small percentage of the richest landowners. The representative basis of the French parliament under the Charter was thus much narrower than that which had been used to elect the Estates-General under the Ancien Régime. Moreover, the Presidents of the Electoral Colleges were appointed by the King, giving the government the ability to influence the outcome of elections.

The Chamber of Peers was appointed by the King, and could consist of both hereditary aristocrats and life peers ennobled in recognition of public service (Article 27). The number of peers was unlimited, meaning that the King could, at any time, add to their number. In addition to its legislative and deliberative role, the Chamber of Peers also acted as a special court for the trial of impeachments (Article 55) and for cases of "high treason and attacks against the security of the state" (Article 33). During the Napoleonic Hundred Days period, the Charter was suspended, only to come back into force after Napoleon's abdication in 1815. All 29 peers appointed in 1814 were removed from power following Napoleon's abdication for allying with him. New peers were appointed in August of the same year, with most of the previously removed getting reinstated in the following years, albeit at a lower rank.

The members of the two Chambers enjoyed certain parliamentary privileges, including immunity from arrest (Articles 34 and 52). The President (Speaker) of the Chamber of Deputies was appointed by the King from a list of five members presented by the Chamber (Article 43), while the Chamber of Peers was presided over by the Chancellor of France, an official appointed by the King (Article 29).

The consent of both Chambers was necessary for the passage of a law. There was no provision for joint sessions or other constitutional means of resolving differences between the Chambers. Proposed laws (bills) could be initiated by the King in either Chamber, except for laws concerning taxes, which had to be initiated in the Chamber of Deputies (Article 17).

== A constitutional, but not parliamentary, monarchy ==
The King's powers were for the most part exercised by his Ministers. The Ministers were chosen by the King. Article 13 stated open-endedly that "Ministers are responsible", but the nature of this responsibility was ambiguous and its extent limited. Articles 55 and 56 restricted this responsibility to "acts of treason and peculation". Moreover, responsibility could only be enforced by impeachment—arraignment by the Chamber of Deputies and trial by the Chamber of Peers. Thus, the Charter gave no recognition to the principle of modern parliamentary government, namely that the Ministers are not just legally, but also politically, responsible to Parliament, and that Parliament can remove Ministers by a simple vote of no-confidence, without having to bring impeachment proceedings.

In this respect, the Charter was not dissimilar to other constitutional documents of its time (even in Britain, where the responsibility of Ministers to Parliament had been established in the eighteenth century, it remained on a purely conventional basis). Therefore, the challenge for the liberal elements of French politics during the Restoration era was to develop a convention of parliamentary government according to which: (i) the King would act only on the advice of his Ministers, and (ii) the Ministers, although formally appointed by the King, would be drawn from amongst the leaders of the majority in Parliament, and would be required to resign if they lost the confidence of Parliament. Owing to the narrow franchise, the dominance of the reactionary Ultra party, and the personal intervention of the King, these conventions did not develop during the 1814–1830 period. Thus, although monarchy under the charter was constitutional, it never evolved into a truly parliamentary system of government.

== Status and amendment ==
The Charter was presented as a gift from the King to the people, not as a constituent act of the people. It ended with the words "Given at Paris, in the year of grace 1814, and of our reign the nineteenth"; this commitment to the principles of "legitimism" would put the reign of Louis XVIII beginning in June 1795, after the death of Louis XVII, the youngest son of Louis XVIII's brother Louis XVI. The King and his successors were bound to swear an oath (Article 74) to maintain the Charter. The Charter contained no provision for future amendment. According to one reading, this made the Charter a truly fundamental law, binding on the King, the Chambers, and the people alike. However, the 1830 revolution established the principle that the Charter, which was then reissued in amended form, could be changed, in the same way as an ordinary law, by the joint act of the King and the Chambers.
