= Raymond-Theodore Troplong =

French politician

President Raymond-Theodore Troplong
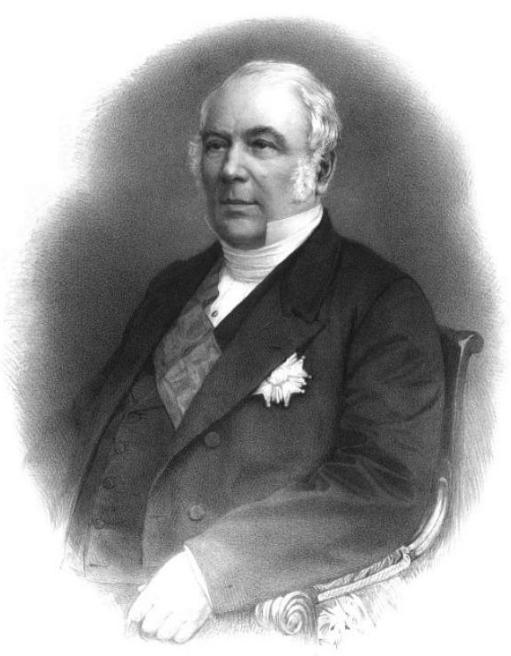
- Raymond-Theodore Troplong; - Lithograph by Auguste Charles Lemoine, after a photograph by Pierre Petit

President of the French Senate
- In office 30 December 1852 – 1 March 1869
- Monarch: Napoleon III

First President of the Court of Cassation
- In office 18 December 1852 – 1 March 1869

Raymond-Theodore Troplong (October 8, 1795 – March 1, 1869) was a French Bonapartist politician of the Second French Empire. He served as President of the Senate of France (1852–1869) and was a member of the Académie des sciences morales et politiques.

== Life ==
Raymond-Theodore Troplong was born in 1795. His career started in 1819, when he became a lawyer. In 1835, he was appointed advisor of the Court of Cassation, while in 1840, he became a member of the Academy of Moral and Political Sciences (Legislation section). He also entered the so-called Chamber of Peers in 1846, while in 1852 he became president of the Court of Cassation.

Troplong co-authored the original text of the French Constitution of 1852 and he was also appointed senator on January 23, 1852. Then he became rapporteur of the sénatus-consulte under Napoleon III (Second French Empire); Troplong legitimized Napoleon III's coup d'état with this argument:

The Republic is practically within the Empire because of the contractual nature of the institution and of the communication, and because of the express delegation of power by the people; but the Empire prevails over the Republic because that is also a monarchy, i.e. the government of everybody confined by the moderating action of one person having heredity as a condition and stability as a result

He replaced the prince Jerome Bonaparte when he resigned from his position of President of the Senate of France on December 30, 1852. He retained this function for most of the Second French Empire (1852-1870) until his death in 1869. In 1858, he was appointed member of the Conseil privé de l'Empereur (i.e. the "Private Council of the Emperor").

Raymond-Theodore Troplong, who was one of the leading jurists of his time (he's been described as the "Portalis of the Second Empire") wrote many books about law, in which he defended a conception of law mixed with philosophy and history. He knew and discussed the work of Friedrich Carl von Savigny, the founder of the German "Ecole historique du droit", and defended neighboring but distinct positions, which seems to prove, despite what has been argued by certain authors (Julien Bonnecase, The School of Exegesis in Civil Law, 1924) his influence on the legal doctrine. In France, the existence and fecundity of a French "School of Law", whose influence is far from being marginal, is still perceived today.

He was a skilled and popular writer, but he was also a very poor speaker, which earned him the sarcasm of Prosper Mérimée, who once said: "Our President, aptly named Troplong" (in French, trop long means "too long").

After death, he wanted to be buried together with his only daughter Joséphine Marie-Louise, who had died in Plombières-les-Bains in October 1839 when she was in that city with her parents for a few days of relaxation; the little girl was just eight years old. The wife of the senator and mother of the girl (1805-1881) also rests in that place. Today, the French Senate still takes care of the maintenance of the tomb.

== Works ==
- De la souveraineté des ducs de Lorraine sur le Barois mouvant et de l'inaliénabilité de leur domaine dans cette partie de leur États. Grimblot, Nancy, 1832.
- Troplong, Raymond Théodore (1842). Droit civil expliqué suvant l'ordre du code. Bruxelles.
- De la nécessité de réformer les études historiques applicables au droit français
- Commentaire de la vente, 1833.
- Du principe d'autorité depuis 1789, les marchands de nouveautés, Paris, 1853.
- De l'influence du christianisme sur le droit civil des Romains. Paris: Hingray. 1843.
- Des pouvoirs de l'État sur l'enregistrement d'après l'Ancien Droit public français, Hingray, Paris, 1844.
- De la propriété d'après le Code civil, Pagnerre, Paris, 1848.
- Des donations entre vifs et des testaments : commentaire du titre II dit livre III du Code civil. Vol. 1. Paris: Hingray. 1850.
- Des donations entre vifs et des testaments : commentaire du titre II dit livre III du Code civil. Vol. 2. Bruxelles: Labroue. 1855.
- Du contrat de mariage et des droits respectifs des époux : commentaire du titre V du livre III dit Code civil, Hingray. Paris, 1850.
- Table alphabétique et analytique dit commentaire du titre V du livre III du Code civil, du contrat de mariage et des droits respectifs des époux, Table publiée avec la seconde édition de l'ouvrage, Hingray, Paris, 1851.
- De la vente ou commentaire du titre VI du livre III du Code civil, Hingray, Paris, 1834 (5^{e} éd. mise en rapport avec la loi du 23 mars 1855 sur la transcription, Paris, 1856).
- De l'échange et du louage, commentaire des titres VII et VIII du livre III du Code civil. Vol. 1. Paris: Hingray. 1840.
- De l'échange et du louage, commentaire des titres VII et VIII du livre IIl du Code civil. Vol. 2. Paris: Hingray. 1852.
- Du contrat de société civile et commerciale, ou Commentaire du titre IX du livre III du Code civil. Paris: Hingray. 1843.
- Du prêt : commentaire du titre X du livre III du Code civil, Hingray, Paris, 1845.
- Du dépôt et du séquestre et des contrats aléatoires : commentaire des titres XI et XII du Livre III du Code civil, Hingray, Paris, 1845.
- Du mandat : commentaire du titre XIII du livre III du Code civil, Hingray, Paris, 1846.
- Du cautionnement et des transactions : commentaire des titres XIV et XV du Livre III du Code Civil, Hingray, Paris, 1846.
- Contraintes par corps en matière civile et de commerce : commentaire du titre XVI du libre III du Code civil, Hingray, Paris, 1847.
- Du nantissement, du gage et de l'antichrèse : commentaire du titre XVII du livre III du Code civil, Hingray, Paris, 1847.
- Des privilèges et hypothèques ou commentaires du titre XVIII du livre III du Code Civil, Hingray, Paris, 1833
- De la prescription ou Commentaire du titre XX du livre III du Code civil. Paris: Hingray. 1835.

Preceded by Jérôme Bonaparte	President of the Senate of France; 1852–1869	Succeeded by Adrien Marie Devienne
