= Charter of 1815 =

French constitution promulgated by Napoleon after returning from exile

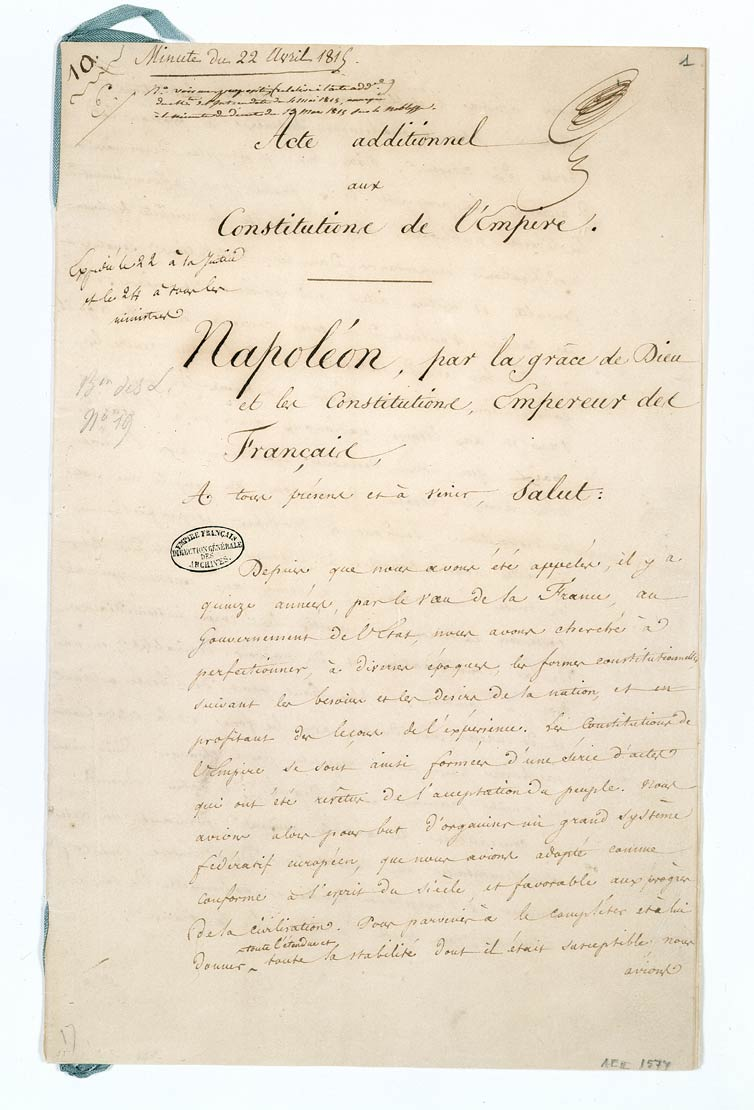
- First page of the act
- Original title: (in French) Acte additionnel aux constitutions de l'Empire du 22 avril 1815
- Ratified: 1815
- System: Unitary parliamentary constitutional monarchy
- Head of state: Emperor
- Chambers: Bicameral (Chamber of Representatives and Chamber of Peers)
- Supersedes: Charter of 1814; Constitution of the Year XII
- Superseded by: Charter of 1814; Charter of 1830

The Charter of 1815, signed on 22 April 1815, was the French constitution prepared by Benjamin Constant at the request of Napoleon I when he returned from exile on Elba. Officially named the Additional Act to the Constitutions of the Empire, the document extensively amended (in fact virtually replacing) the previous Napoleonic Constitutions (Constitution of the Year VIII, Constitution of the Year X and Constitution of the Year XII). The Additional Act reframed the Napoleonic constitution into something more along the lines of the Bourbon Restoration's Charter of 1814 of Louis XVIII, while otherwise ignoring the Bourbon charter's existence. It was very liberal in spirit, and gave the French people rights which had previously been unknown to them, such as the right to elect the mayor in communes of less than 5,000 in population. Napoleon treated it as a mere continuation of the previous constitutions, and it therefore took the form of an ordinary legislative act "additional to the constitutions of the Empire".

== Preparation ==
Napoleon, having returned from the Island of Elba for the Hundred Days, was not able to re-establish the First Empire as it had been before his restoration. He asked the liberal Benjamin Constant to prepare a new Constitution. It was adopted by a plebiscite on June 1, 1815 by an immense majority of the five million voters, although a great many eligible voters abstained. It was promulgated in the Champ de Mai ceremony at the Champ de Mars. The rapid fall of Napoleon prevented it from being fully applied.

== Principles ==
The legislative power was to be exercised by the Emperor together with the Parliament, which was to be composed of two chambers: the Chamber of Peers composed of hereditary members appointed by the Emperor, and the Chamber of Representatives, composed of 629 citizens elected for 5 year terms by electoral colleges in the individual departments. The ministers were to be responsible to the Parliament for their actions. The liberalization dealt both with the guarantees of rights and the end of censorship. In the end, the two chambers held sessions for only one month, from June 3 to July 7, 1815.

== See also ==
- Charter of 1814
