= Sénatus-consulte =

Type of legislative act in imperial France

A sénatus-consulte (French translation of Latin: senatus consultum, lit. 'decree of the senate') was a specialized type of primary legislation during the French Consulate (1799–1804), First French Empire (1804–1814, 1815) and Second French Empire (1852–1870). It was issued on the authority of the Senate in its various forms, and took the form of a decree with the force of law. During the imperial periods, the sénatus-consulte was the primary procedural mechanism used to issue constitutional amendments.

== Consulate and First Empire ==
In the period of the Consulate and the First Empire, the Constitution of the Year VIII (later substantially amended by the Constitution of the Year XII), the Sénat Conservateur was the foremost chamber of the tricameral legislature. A sénatus-consulte was a form of decree with the force of law, issued by the Senate, initially for the purpose of elaborating on or interpreting the Constitution. Later, the sénatus-consulte became an ordinary form of primary legislation. Constitutional amendments were enacted in the form of a special Organic Sénatus-Consulte. The Constitution of the Year X and Constitution of the Year XII were enacted in this legislative form.

== Second Empire ==
After the French coup of 1851, Napoleon I's institutional architecture was reintroduced. Executive power was retained by Napoleon III and his appointed ministry, who subordinated legislative power by dividing it between two chambers:

- The Corps législatif where deputies did not have the power to initiate legislation, that being reserved to the a Conseil d'État made up of civil servants;
- The Sénat, whose members were named for life by the emperor.

The Sénat could pass sénatus-consultes, decrees with the force of law, to adapt France's institutions and modify the French Constitution of 1852. Initially used to found and reinforce the imperial and authoritarian character of the Second Empire, sénatus-consultes ended up helping the regime evolve into a 'liberal empire' from the 1860s onwards by giving more powers to the Parlement.

=== List of sénatus-consultes passed under the Second Empire (1852–1870) ===
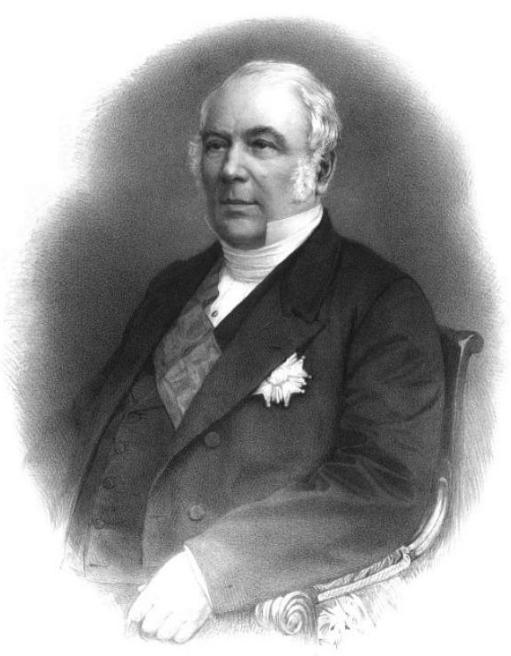
Raymond-Théodore Troplong, rapporteur of the sénatus-consulte of 7 November 1852, président of the Sénat from 1852 to 1869.

==== Sénatus-consultes accompanying the establishment of the imperial regime (1852) ====
- 7 November 1852: The republican constitution of 14 January 1852 was modified to restore the imperial dignity on behalf of Louis-Napoleon Bonaparte (Napoleon III). This sénatus-consulte was ratified by a plebiscite.
- 12 December 1852: The emperor's civil list and the endowment for the crown were defined.
- 25 December 1852: The emperor assumed additional rights (rights of pardon and amnesty, the right to preside over the Sénat and Conseil d'État) while many points in the constitution were modified in order to affirm the monarchical character of institutions. Allowances for senators and deputies were fixed. The oath of faithfulness required of ministers, parliamentarians, officials, magistrates and civil servants was reformulated. Other articles legislated on secondary points (the "French prince" ordinance, treaties of commerce, public works...)

==== Sénatus-consultes of varying importance under the authoritarian regime (1856–1858) ====
- 23 April 1856: The role of the administrator of the endowment for the crown was specified.
- 17 July 1856: The terms of a regency were established on behalf of the empress, Eugénie de Montijo.
- 27 May 1857: One article of the Constitution was modified to create the position of supplementary deputy in departments with more than 17,500 voters.
- 17 February 1858: As part of the plan to repress the republic movement following the assassination attempt by Felice Orsini, candidates for legislative elections were required to sign and deposit with the prefecture a written version of the oath of loyalty to the emperor.

==== Sénatus-consultes indicating the regime's liberal evolution (1860s–1870) ====
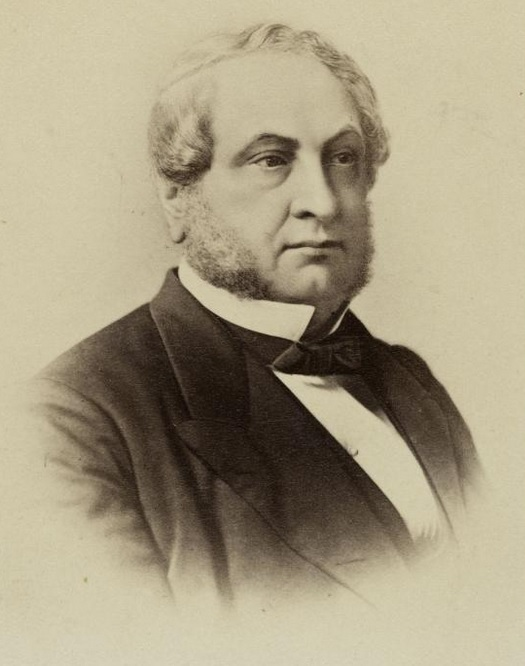
Eugène Rouher was a pillar of the authoritarian regime, but it was under his presidency of the Sénat (1869–70) that the regime transformed into a liberal empire.

- 2 February 1861: An article of the Constitution was modified to authorize the reproduction and distribution of the legislative body's debates.
- 31 December 1861: The legislative body was given the ability to vote on the budget by sections and consequently to question the conduct of individual ministers.
- 22 April 1863: Organization of the status of landed property. In Algeria, division of land according to different types of ownership.
- 14 July 1865: For Algeria, the "indigenous" status of Muslims and Jews was defined as well as the conditions for naturalization of foreign residents. Naturalization required at least three years of residence.
- 18 July 1866: Discussions concerning the Constitution could only take place in the Senate. The articles of the Constitution concerning the length of sessions of the legislative body and the elaboration of ideas for law were modified. Legislative sessions, formerly fixed at three months, were to be set by imperial decree. Going forward, amendments to laws rejected by the Council of State could gain a new examination if the deputies requested.
- 14 March 1867: The article of the Constitution setting the conditions for refusing to promulgate a law was modified. Henceforth a new deliberation of the legislative body could be requested by senators before the definitive pronouncement, creating a kind of parliamentary reconciliation ("navette" or shuttle in French).
- 8 September 1869: The Constitution was modified in a more liberal and parliamentary spirit, notably after the "Interpellation of the 116," a claim lodged with the Emperor by a group of 116 deputies: the initiation of laws, formerly reserved to the emperor, was endowed on the legislative body.
- 20 April 1870: Ministers were henceforth accountable to Parliament. This sénatus-consulte was ratified by the 1870 French constitutional referendum.
- 21 May 1870: The new Constitution confirmed the liberal and parliamentary transformation of the regime.
