= Sénat conservateur =

Legislative body of Napoleonic France

Conservative Senate Sénat conservateur

History
- Founded: 1799
- Disbanded: 1814
- Preceded by: Council of Ancients
- Succeeded by: Chamber of Peers

Meeting place
- Luxembourg Palace

Constitution
- Constitution of the Year VIII

The Sénat conservateur (French pronunciation: [sena kɔ̃sɛʁvatœʁ], "Conservative Senate") was an advisory body established in France during the Consulate following the French Revolution. It was established in 1799 under the Constitution of the Year VIII following the Napoleon Bonaparte-led Coup of 18 Brumaire. It lasted until 1814 when Napoleon Bonaparte was overthrown and the Bourbon monarchy was restored.

With the Tribunat and the Corps législatif, the Sénat formed one of the three major assemblies of the Consulate. Although it did not exercise ordinary legislative powers, the constitutions of Year X (1802) and Year XII (1804) reinforced its constitutional authority, notably through the use of sénatus-consultes.

== History ==
=== Conserving the constitution ===
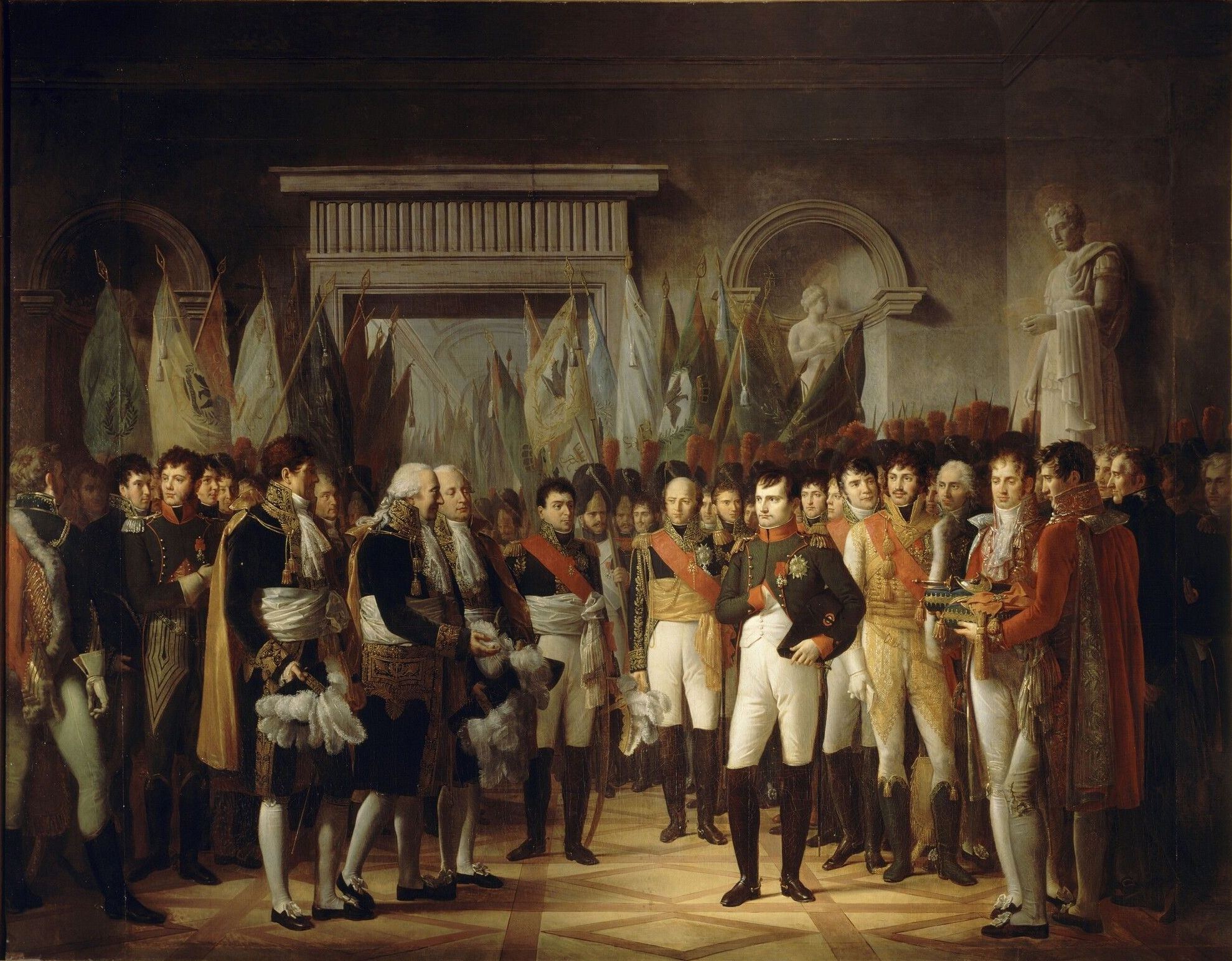
Napoleon receives the delegates of the Sénat conservateur at the Stadtschloss, Berlin, 19 November 1806 (Napoleon Receiving the Senate Deputies in Berlin by René Théodore Berthon, 1808).

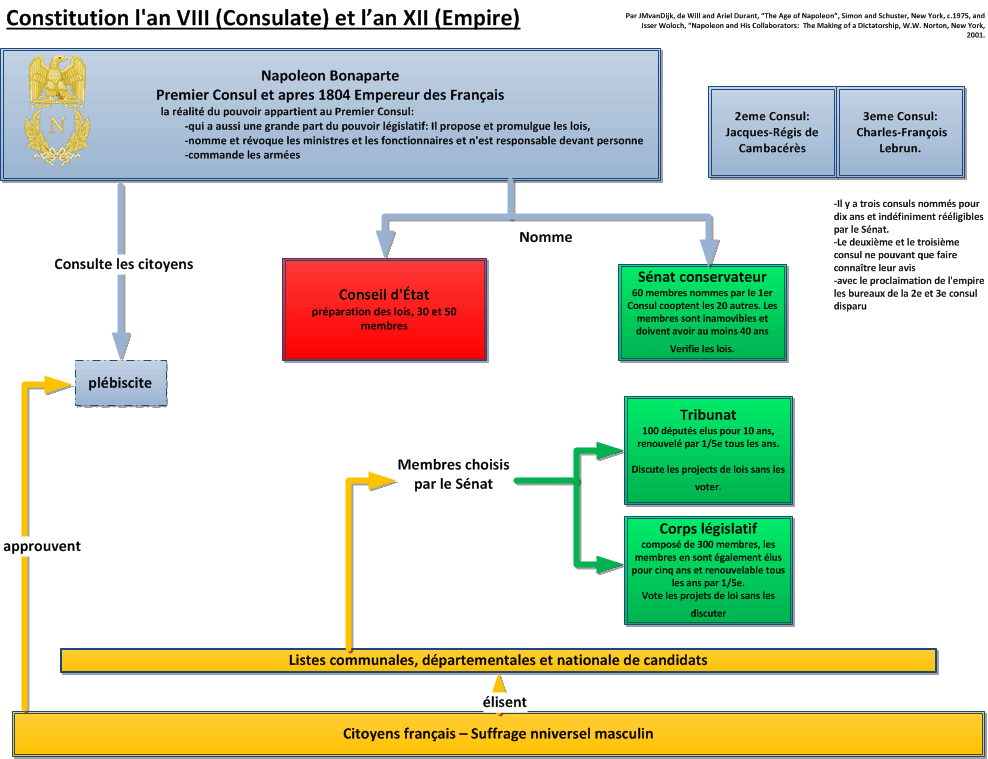
Relation between different offices and assemblies under the Constitution of the Year VIII.

Set up under the direct influence of the regime's new master, First Consul Napoleon Bonaparte, the Constitution of the Year VIII, enacted on 13 December 1799, was the first to recreate a senate. Napoleon was to make this "Sénat conservateur", charged with watching over the survival of the Constitution, a key element in his regime.

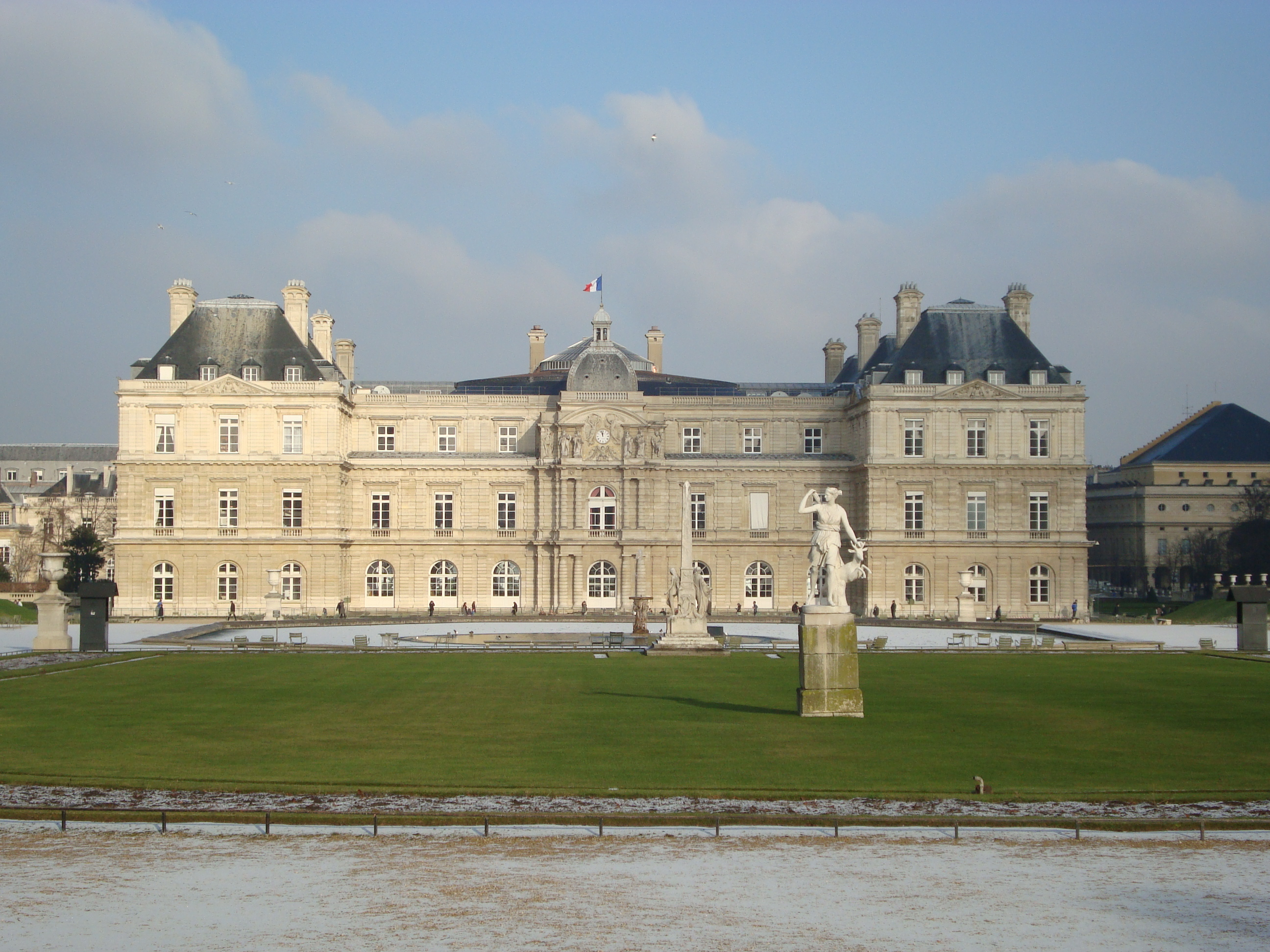
The Sénat conservateur met in the Luxembourg Palace.

This first senate had to be made up of only 60 inamovible (immoveable, i.e. permanent) members, aged at least 40, to which had to be added two supplementary members every year for ten years, ending up with 20 supplementary members. There was no longer any question of elections (even indirect ones) to form this assembly. The Constitution provided for the Abbé Sieyès and Roger Ducos, the outgoing second and third consuls, to become ex officio members of the Senate. In consultation with Jean-Jacques-Régis de Cambacérès and Charles-François Lebrun (the new second and third consuls directly designated by the Constitution), it also granted the outgoing consuls the privilege of choosing the majority of the Senate (i.e. 29 other senators). This majority then picked the rest of the members. The Senate thus recruited itself and subsequently replaced deceased members by choosing from among three candidates presented to it by the First Consul, the Tribunat and the Corps législatif.

The Napoleonic senate set itself up at the Luxembourg Palace, based in a semicircle of seats added to the central part of the building by the Palace's architect Jean-François Chalgrin – in the words of the Constitution, "The sittings [of the Senate] are not [to be] public". The first Sénat conservateur included former members of the revolutionary assemblies (François de Neufchâteau, Dominique Joseph Garat, Jean Denis, comte Lanjuinais), as well as scholars (Gaspard Monge, Joseph Louis Lagrange, Bernard Germain de Lacépède, Claude Louis Berthollet), philosophers (Pierre Jean George Cabanis), and even the explorer Louis Antoine de Bougainville and the painter Joseph-Marie Vien, member of the Institut.

=== The era of "Sénatus-consulte"s ===
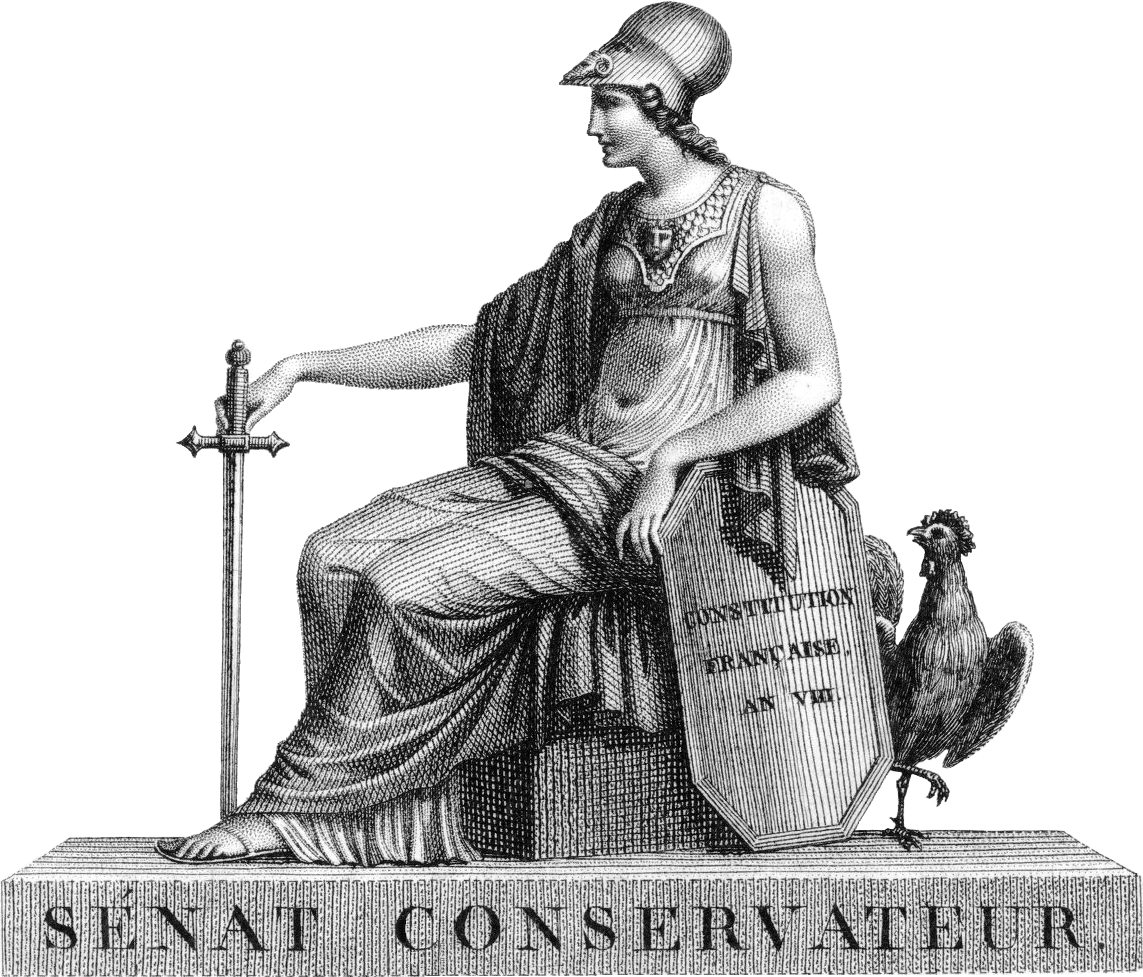
Letterhead.

In year X (1802), a revision of the Constitution reinforced senators' positions. From then on the Senate would rule via acts having the force of law, known as "sénatus-consultes", in all matters unforeseen by the Constitution and which needed political action from the regime. The procedure was used, for example, for the 1802 amnesty for émigrés.

The number of senators rose to 120. First Consul Bonaparte directly controlled the Senate's activity and composition – he convened it, presided over it, reserved the right to present it with its candidates, personally designated three candidates from the list of citizens elected by the electoral colleges and could also name senators of his own initiative.

==== Examples of "Sénatus-consulte"s ====
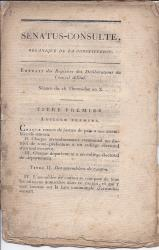
First page of the Constitution of the Year X.

- Sénatus-consulte du 22 Ventôse An X (13 March 1802) relating to the manner in which the renewal of the first four-fifths of the Corps législatif and of the Tribunat would be made in year X, and in the 3 subsequent years
- Sénatus-consulte du 6 Floréal An X (26 April 1802) relating to émigrés
- Sénatus-consulte du 14 Thermidor An X (2 août 1802), proclaiming Napoleon "First Consul for life"
- Sénatus-consulte organique du 16 Thermidor an X (4 August 1802), on the Constitution
- Sénatus-consulte organique du 8 Fructidor an X (26 August 1802), reuniting Elba into the territory of the French Republic
- Sénatus-consulte du 8 Fructidor an X (26 August 1802) relating to the classification of the members of the Corps législatif "en séries", and the means of reducing the members of the Tribunat
- Sénatus-consulte du 8 Fructidor an X (26 August 1802), relating to the terms under which the "sénatus-consulte" pronouncing the dissolution of the Corps législatif and/or the Tribunat would be edited
- Sénatus-consulte du 10 Fructidor An X (28 August 1802), designating the towns whose mayors would be present at the oath-taking of any citizen named to succeed the first consul
- Sénatus-consulte organique du 24 Fructidor an X (11 September 1802), reuniting the departments of Pô, Doire, Marengo, la Sezia, la Stura and Le Tanaro into the territory of the French Republic
- Sénatus-consulte du 26 Vendémiaire An XI (18 October 1802), suspending jury functions in several departments during years XI and XII
- Sénatus-consulte organique du 26 Vendémiaire An XI (18 October 1802), relating to foreigners becoming naturalised French citizens, for services rendered to the Republic, importing of useful inventions or the foundation of major establishments.
- Sénatus-consulte du 8 Ventôse an XII (28 February 1804), suspending jury functions for treason trials for years XII and XIII.
- Sénatus-consulte du 27 mars 1805, concerning the grant of French citizenship to prince Camillo Filippo Ludovico Borghese
- Sénatus-consulte du 9 septembre 1805, on the reestablishment of the Gregorian calendar
- Sénatus-consulte organique du 28 octobre 1805, concerning the return of Gênes, etc., into the French Empire, and the deputations to furnish to the Corps législatif by the departments of Gênes, Montenotte and les Apennins

=== A pampered elite ===
In January 1803 Napoleon created the system of sénatoreries, which ensured the senators' complete compliance and docility. From June 1804 onwards, these were granted to 36 senators and made these senators regional "super-préfets". They gave these senators the right, during their own lifetime, to have a residential palace (a château or a former episcopal palace) and to annual revenue from 20,000 to 25,000 francs – doubling ordinary senatorial pay. For example, Berthollet received the sénatorerie of Montpellier, occupied the bishop's palace at Narbonne and received an annual revenue of 22,690 francs.

=== Rise and fall of an emperor ===
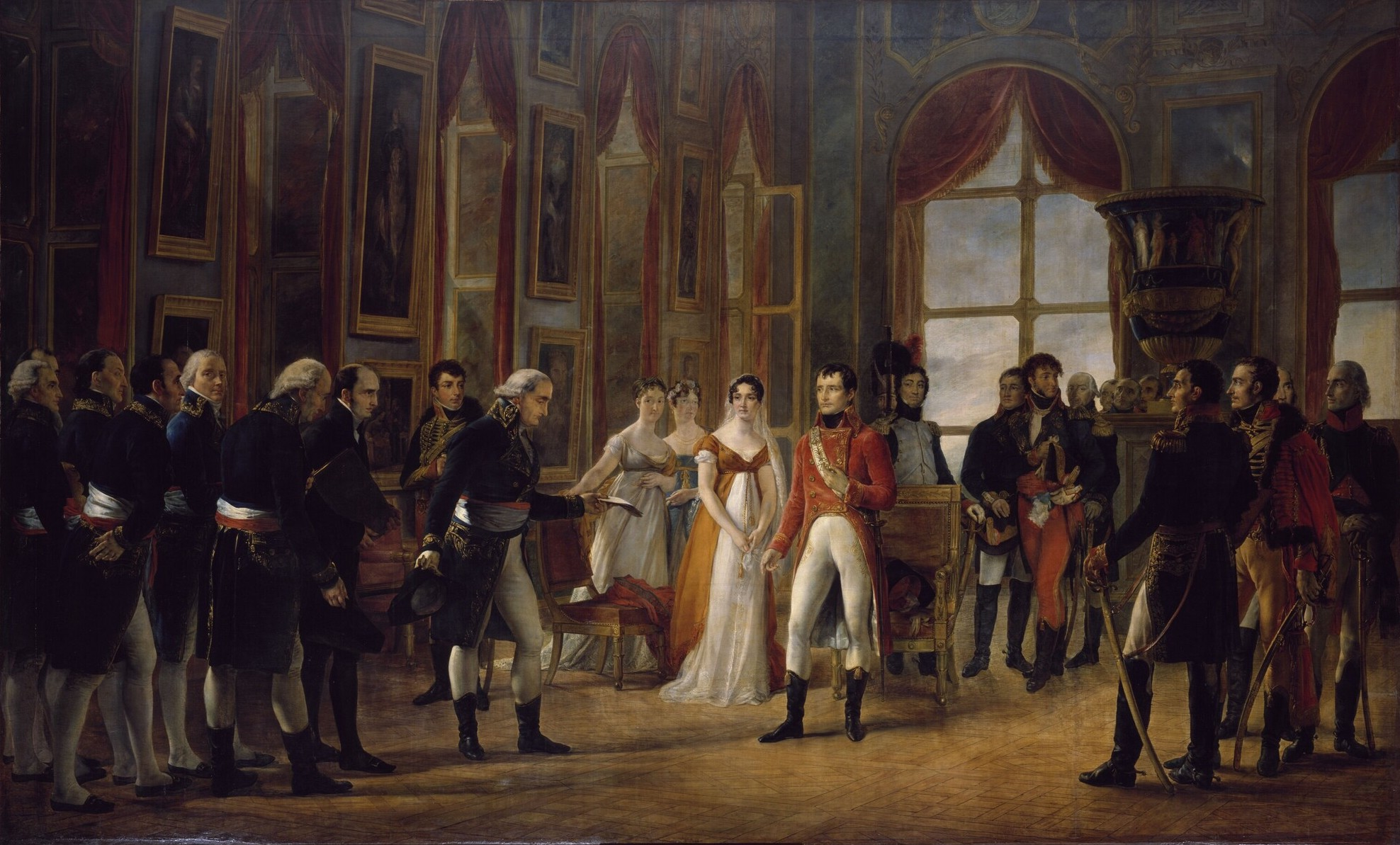
Painting by Georges Rouget showing Napoleon in Saint-Cloud receiving the sénatus-consulte proclaiming him Emperor of the French (1804).

The Constitution of the Year XII (1804) proclaimed the First French Empire and increased the Senate's dependency on Napoleon (now emperor). Napoleon's rewards to his senators became more and more frequent, as did the senators' shows of allegiance to him. On 1 January 1806, in homage to these "sages de l’Empire" (wise-men of the Empire), the emperor granted the senators 54 enemy flags. The "sénateur maréchal d’Empire" (marshal of France) Catherine-Dominique de Pérignon then enthusiastically proposed the construction of a triumphal arch to the glory of the emperor, a suggestion warmly backed by his colleagues, including senator Bernard Germain de Lacépède.

Napoléon summoned into the Senate the French princes, the Great Dignitaries and his closest friends, with no limit on numbers. He granted this to his brother Joseph, but also to Cambacérès, Chaptal, Fouché, Fontanes, Tronchet and generals such as Caulaincourt and Duroc.

Despite being laden with Napoleon's favours, the senators nonetheless proclaimed his fall on 3 May 1814 and summoned Louis XVIII to take the throne. Louis XVIII abolished the senate.

== Presidents of the Sénat conservateur ==
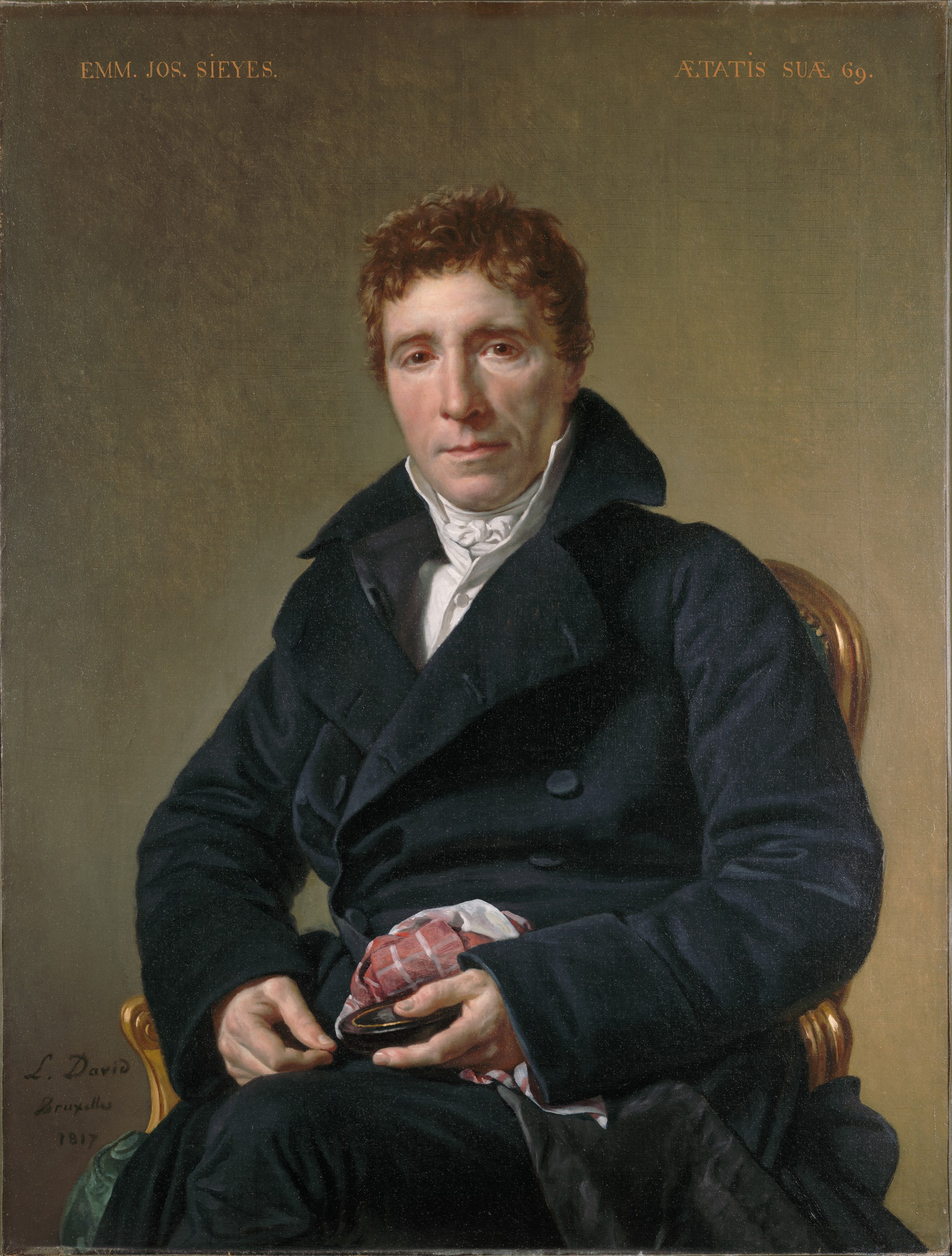
The Abbé Sieyès, president of the Sénat conservateur 1799–1801.

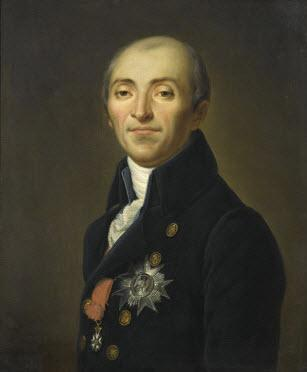
Bernard Germain de Lacépède, president of the Sénat conservateur 1811–1813.

=== Consulate ===
- From the first sitting of 4 Nivôse Year VIII (25 December 1799) onwards, the oldest of the first members who sat at that time presided:
- 5 nivôse, year VIII (27 December 1799) – 13 February 1800: Emmanuel Joseph Sieyès
- 13 February 1800 – 27 February 1801: François Barthélemy
- 27 February 1801 – 2 August 1801: François Denis Tronchet
- 2 August 1801 – 18 January 1802: François Christophe Kellermann
- 18 January 1802 – 4 August 1802: Louis-Nicolas Lemercier

=== Empire ===
- 19 May 1804 – 19 May 1806: Nicolas-Louis François de Neufchâteau
- 19 May 1806 – 1 July 1807: Gaspard Monge
- 1 July 1807 – 1 July 1808: Bernard Germain de Lacépède
- 1 July 1808 – 1 July 1809: comte de Saint-Vallier
- 1 July 1809 – 1 July 1811: Germain Garnier
- 1 July 1811 – 1 July 1813: Bernard Germain de Lacépède
