= 1815 French constitutional referendum =

A constitutional referendum on the Charter of 1815 of the First French Empire, with Napoleon I restored to power in place of Louis XVIII, was held on 22 April 1815. Like in previous French referendums, the officially announced result was nearly unanimous. Out of seven and a half million eligible voters, 79% abstained that day. Compared to the 1804 referendum, the yes vote had a net loss 2 million votes.

== Results ==
Party	% of votes	Votes
Yes	99.67%	1,305,206
No	0.33%	4,206
Total	100%	
