= François-Marie, marquis de Barthélemy =

French politician and diplomat (1747–1830)

Marquess François Barthélemy
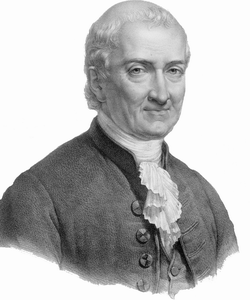

Member of the French Chamber of Peers
- In office 6 April 1814 – 3 April 1830
- Monarchs: Louis XVIII; Charles X

Member of the French Conservative Senate
- In office 27 December 1799 – 14 April 1814
- Monarch: Napoleon I

President of the Directory
- In office 26 May 1797 – 5 September 1797
- President: Paul Barras
- Preceded by: Étienne-François Letourneur
- Succeeded by: François de Neufchâteau

French Ambassador to Switzerland
- In office 3 September 1791 – 2 November 1795

Personal details
- Born: 20 October 1747 Aubagne, Kingdom of France
- Died: 3 April 1830 (aged 82) Paris, Kingdom of France
- Resting place: Père Lachaise Cemetery
- Party: Independent (1791–1795); Clichyen (1795–1797)
- Profession: Diplomat
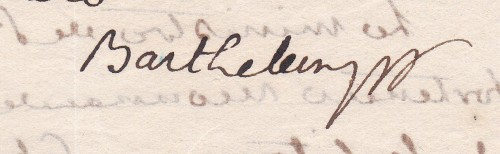
- Signature

François-Marie, Marquess of Barthélemy (20 October 1747 - April 1830 Paris) was a French politician and diplomat, active at the time of the French Revolution.

== Biography ==
=== Diplomat and member of the Directory ===
Born in Aubagne, he was educated by his uncle the abbé Jean-Jacques Barthélemy for a diplomatic career. After serving as secretary of legation in Sweden, in Switzerland and in the Kingdom of Great Britain, he was appointed Minister Plenipotentiary in Switzerland, in which capacity he negotiated the treaties of Basel with Prussia and Spain (1795).

Elected a member of the Directory in May 1797, through Royalist influence, he was arrested after General Augereau's anti-Royalist coup d'état of the 18 Fructidor (17 September 1797), and deported to French Guiana, but escaped and made his way to Suriname, then to the United States, and finally to Britain.

=== Empire ===
Barthélemy returned to France after Napoleon Bonaparte's 18 Brumaire coup, entered the Senate in February 1800 and contributed to the establishment of the Consulship for life and the First French Empire.

In 1814 he abandoned Napoleon, voted the Acte de déchéance de l'Empereur and took part in the drawing up of King Louis XVIII's Constitutional Charter and was named Peer of France. During the Hundred Days he lived in concealment, and after the Second Restoration obtained the title marquis, and in 1819 introduced a motion in the chamber of Peers tending to render the electoral law more aristocratic.

=== Legacy ===
The Rue François Barthélémy in Héricy is named after him.

== Death ==
Barthélemy died 3 April 1830 in Paris.
