= 1804 French constitutional referendum =

Plebiscite establishing Napoleon as Emperor

A referendum concerning the establishment of the French Empire was held in France in June 1804. The result showed a virtually unanimous French electorate approving the change in Napoleon Bonaparte's status from First Consul to Emperor of the French, although the votes are assumed to have been manipulated.

== Background ==
The plebiscite, provided for by article 142 of the Sénatus-consulte, relates to the question of the imperial succession as defined in the Constitution of 1804, which established the First Empire. The vote was public, permitting neither blank votes nor invalid ones.

== Results ==
The counting of the votes ended in 2 August and the results were announced in 6 November. A coronation ceremony was held a month later, on 2 December.

1804 French Constitutional Referendum
Choice	Votes	%
For	3,521,675	99.93
Against	2,579	0.07
Total	3,524,254	100.00

No : 2,579 (0.07%)	Yes : 3,521,675 (99.93%)
▲
