= Sénatorerie =

Properties given by Napoleon to senators

The sénatoreries were the great properties distributed by Napoléon Bonaparte to senators in an implicit exchange for their docility towards his regime, as it became less and less democratic, starting on 4 January 1803 (223 years ago). They were created by the sénatus-consulte of the sénat conservateur of 14 nivôse year XI (4 January 1803).

For example, Emmanuel-Joseph Sieyès received a large domain near Cosne-sur-Loire.

== Sources ==
- J. Monnier & A. Jardin, 1789–1848, Nathan.
