= François Marie d'Aboville =

French soldier, politician and officer (1730–1817)

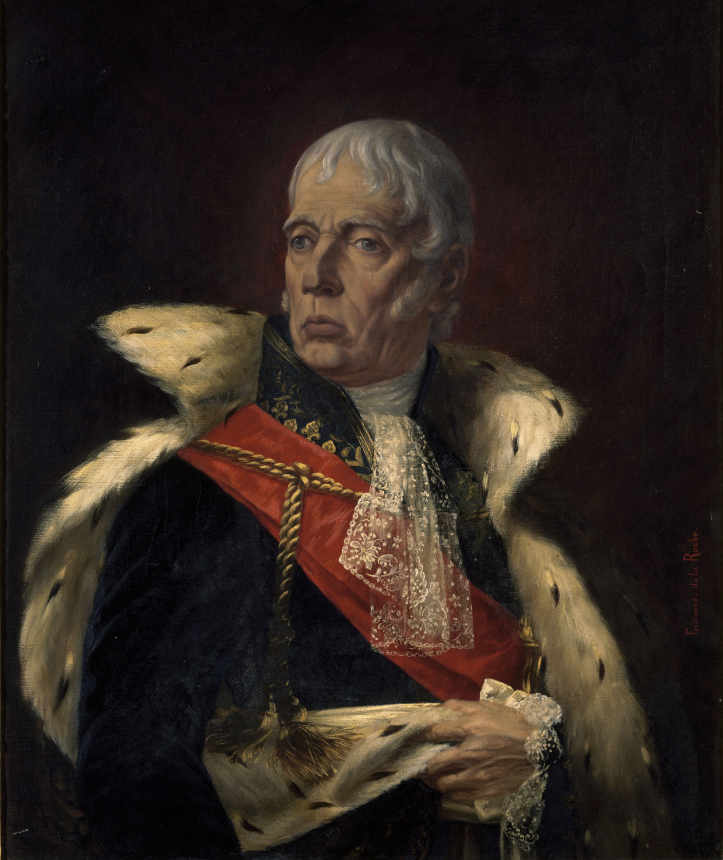
François Marie d'Aboville

François Marie, comte d'Aboville (23 January 1730 – 1 November 1817) was a French général de division (major general). He was the father of Augustin Gabriel d'Aboville and Augustin-Marie d'Aboville. He was born in Brest. He fought in the Seven Years' War. He fought in the American Revolutionary War against the British at the siege of Yorktown in 1781. He fought at the Battle of Valmy in the War of the First Coalition. During the Hundred Days of 1815 and after the Bourbon Restoration, he served in the Chamber of Peers. He was a grand officer of the Legion of Honour and a recipient of the Grand Cross of the Order of Saint Louis.
