= Constitution of the Year XII =

1804 constitution establishing the First French Empire

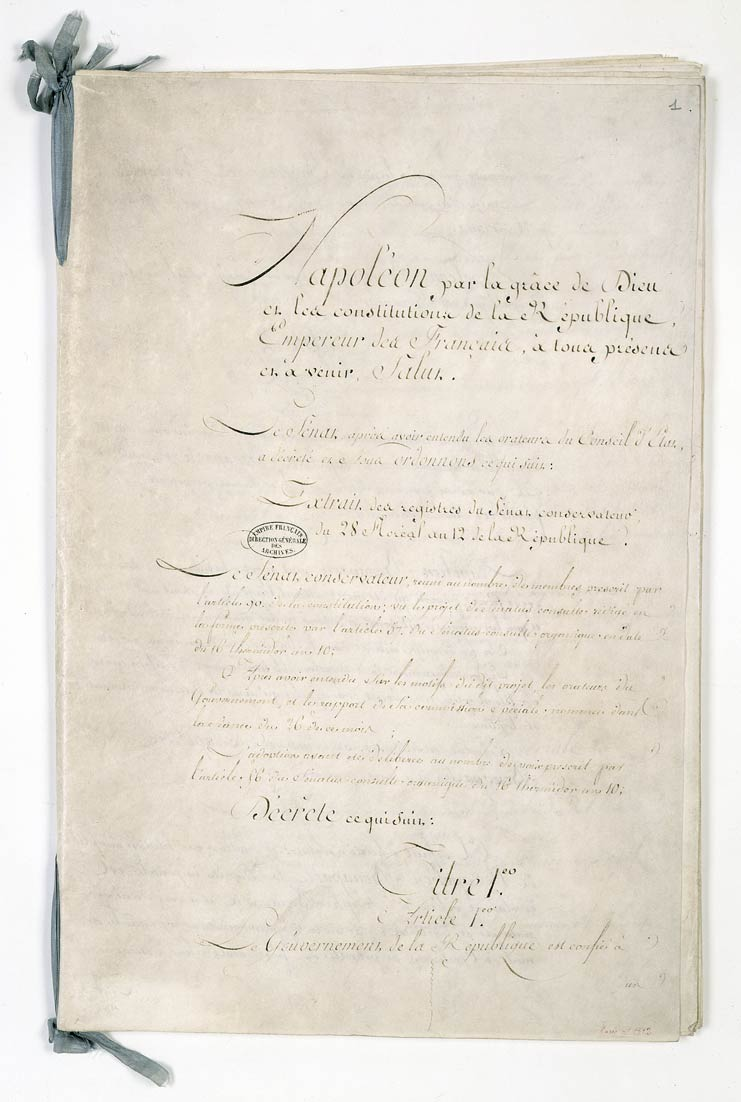
- Constitution of the Year XII (1804).
- Original title: (in French) Constitution de l'an XII
- Ratified: 1804
- System: Unitary absolute monarchy
- Chambers: Upper house: Sénat conservateur Lower house: Corps législatif
- Executive: Emperor
- Repealed: 1814
- Supersedes: Constitution of the Year X
- Superseded by: Charter of 1814

The Constitution of the Year XII (French: Constitution de l’an XII), also called the Organic Sénatus-consulte of 28 Floréal, year XII (Sénatus-consulte organique du 28 floréal an XII), was a national constitution of the French First Republic adopted during the Year XII of the French Revolutionary Calendar (1804 in the Gregorian calendar).

It amended the earlier Constitution of the Year VIII and Constitution of the Year X, establishing the First French Empire with Napoleon Bonaparte — previously First Consul for Life, with wide-ranging powers – as Napoleon I, Emperor of the French. The Constitution established the House of Bonaparte as France's imperial dynasty, making the throne hereditary in Napoleon's family. The Constitution of the Year XII was later itself extensively amended by the Additional Act and definitively abolished with the final return of the Bourbons in 1815.

This text of 142 articles founded a new regime, the First Empire, and adapted the old institutions to this regime.

== See also ==
- 1804 French constitutional referendum
