= Germain Garnier =

French writer, politician and economist

Germain Garnier, Marquis, (8 November 1754 – 4 October 1821), was a French politician and economist of the 18th and 19th centuries.

Garnier was educated for the law, and obtained when young the office of procureur to the Châtelet in Paris. On the calling of the states-general he was elected as one of the députés suppléants of the city of Paris, and in 1791 administrator of the department of Paris. After the 10th of August 1792 he withdrew to the Pays de Vaud, and did not return to France till 1795. In public life, however, he seems to have been singularly fortunate. In 1797 he was on the list of candidates for the Directory; in 1800 he was prefect of Seine-et-Oise; and in 1804 he was made senator and in 1808 a count. After the Restoration he obtained a peerage, and on the return of Louis XVIII, after the Hundred Days, he became minister of state and member of privy council, and in 1817 was created a marquis. He died at Paris on the 4th of October 1821. At court he was, when young, noted for his facile power of writing society verse, but his literary reputation depends rather on his later works on political economy, especially his translation, with notes and introduction, of Adam Smith's Wealth of Nations (1805) and his Histoire de la monnaie (2 vols., 1819). He also wrote Abrégé des principes de l’écon. polit. (1796). The Description géographique, physique, et politique du département de Seine-et-Oise (1802) was drawn up from his instructions. Other works are De la propriété (1792) and Histoire des banques d’escompte (1806).

Coat of arms with common ornaments
