= Chamber of Peers (France) =

French upper house from 1814 to 1848

Chamber of Peers Chambre des Pairs

Type
- Type: Upper house of the French Parliament

History
- Founded: June 4, 1814
- Disbanded: February 24, 1848
- Preceded by: Sénat conservateur
- Succeeded by: Senate

Structure
- Political groups: Ultra-royalists; Liberal royalists Republicans; Independents; Doctrinaires

Meeting place
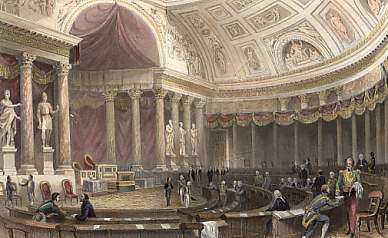
- Luxembourg Palace, Paris

Constitution
- Charter of 1814; Charter of 1815; Charter of 1830

The Chamber of Peers (French: Chambre des pairs) was the upper house of the French parliament from 1814 to 1848.

== History ==
The Peerage of France was recreated by the Charter of 1814 at the same time as the Bourbon Restoration, albeit on a different basis from that of the ancien regime before 1789. A new Chamber of Peers was created which was similar to the British House of Lords, and it met at the Palais du Luxembourg. This new Chamber of Peers acted as the upper house of the French parliament. Like the House of Lords, the Chamber of Peers also had a judicial function, being authorized to judge peers and other prominent people. As such, it sentenced Marshal Ney to death.

To begin with, the Chamber had 154 members, including the holders of all surviving pre-Revolutionary ecclesiastical (Reims, Langres, and Châlons) and lay peerages, except for the Duchy of Aubigny, which was held by a foreigner, the British Duke of Richmond. Thirteen peers were also prelates.

New members were appointed by the French king, without limit on their numbers. Such a peerage was either granted for life or was heritable, at the king's will. All men of the royal family and all descendants in the male line of previous kings (princes du sang) were members of the chamber by birth (pairs-nés), but nevertheless needed explicit permission from the king to sit at each session of the chamber.

At the outset comprising only hereditary peers and certain prelates of the church, the Chamber became a body to which men were appointed for life following the July Revolution of 1830. In the Revolution of 1848, the Chamber of Peers was disbanded and the peerage of France was abolished.

== Famous members ==
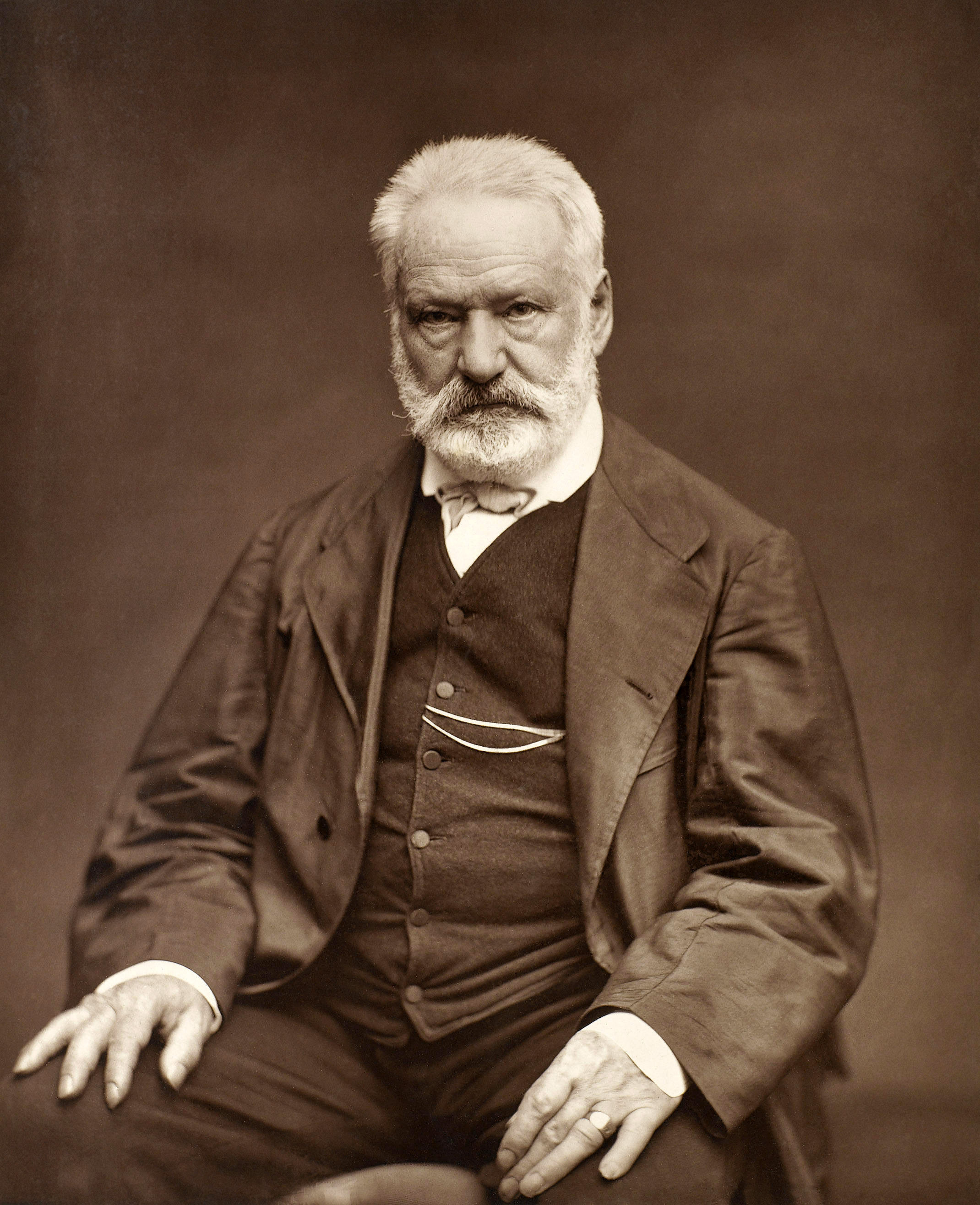
Victor Hugo (1802–1885), novelist

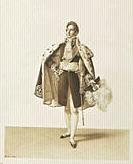
Coronation of Charles X of France, a peer of France (by François Joseph Heim)

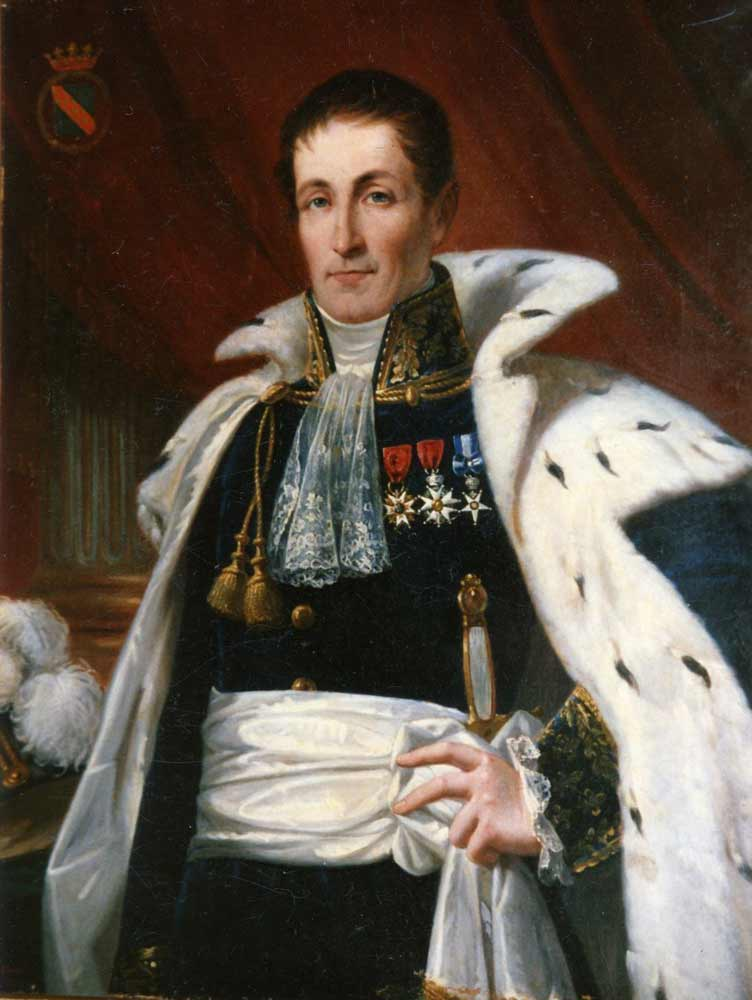
Louis-Marie-François de La Forest Divonne.

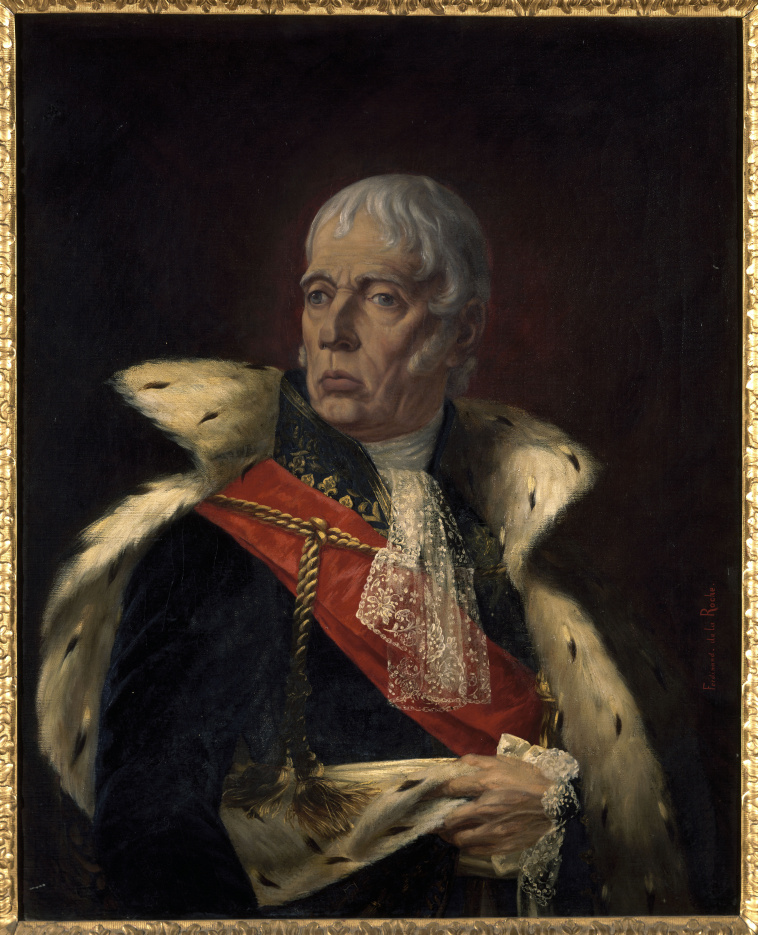
Count François Marie d'Aboville (by Ferdinand de Laroche)

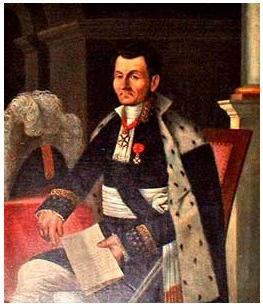
Claude-Pierre de Delay d'Agier

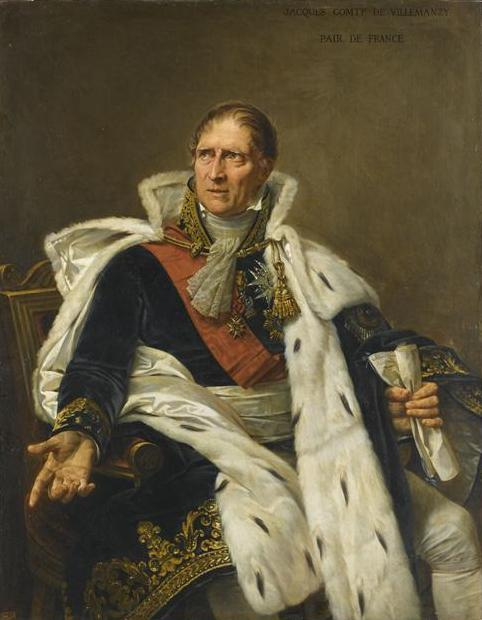
Jacques-Pierre Orillard de Villemanzy (1751–1830) (by Antoine-Jean Gros)

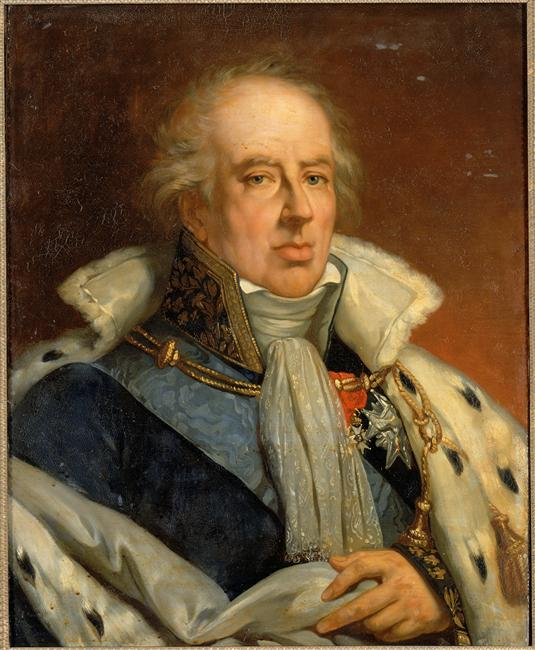
François Alexandre Frédéric, duc de la Rochefoucauld-Liancourt (1747–1827)

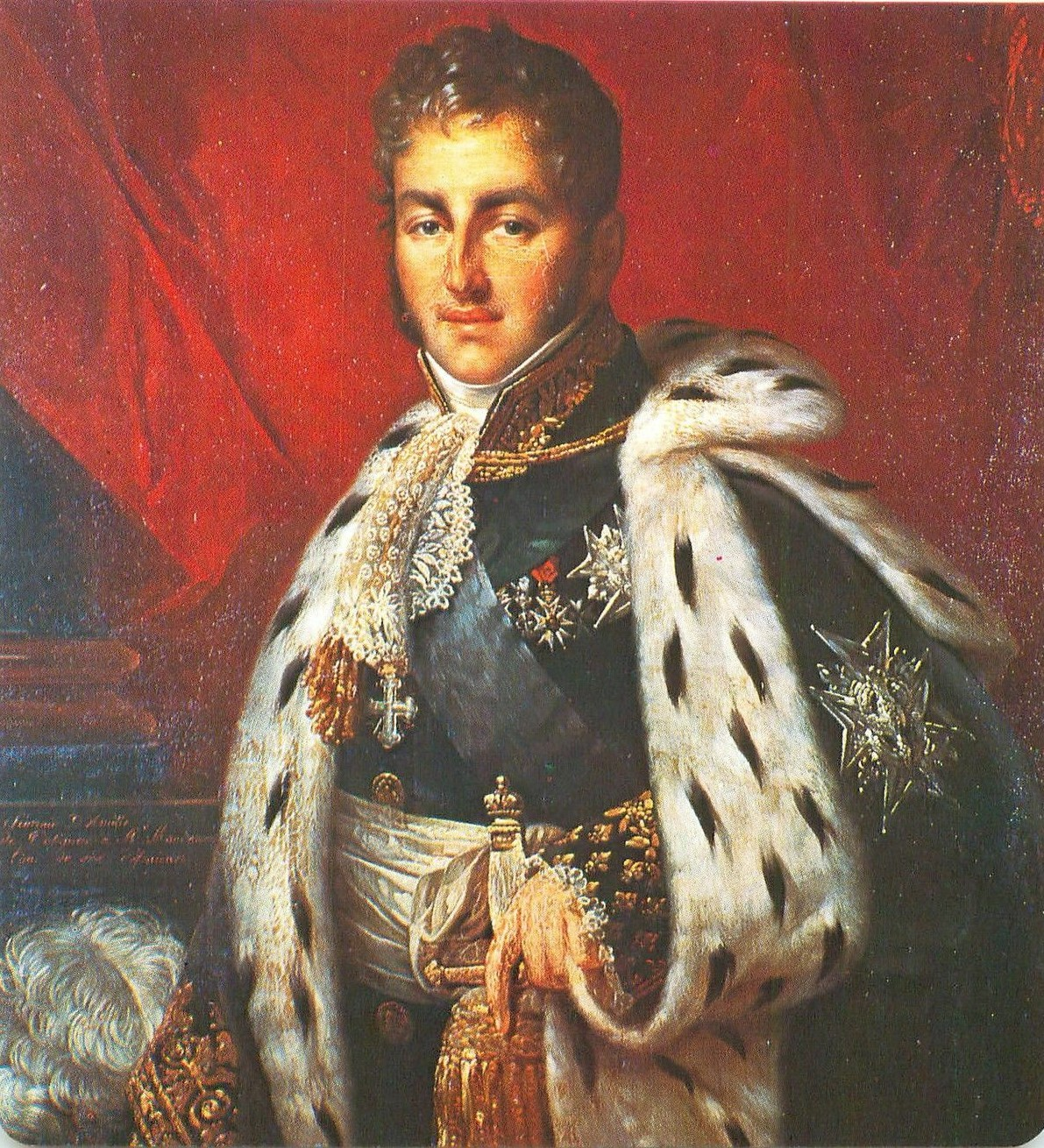
Jules de Polignac (1780–1847)

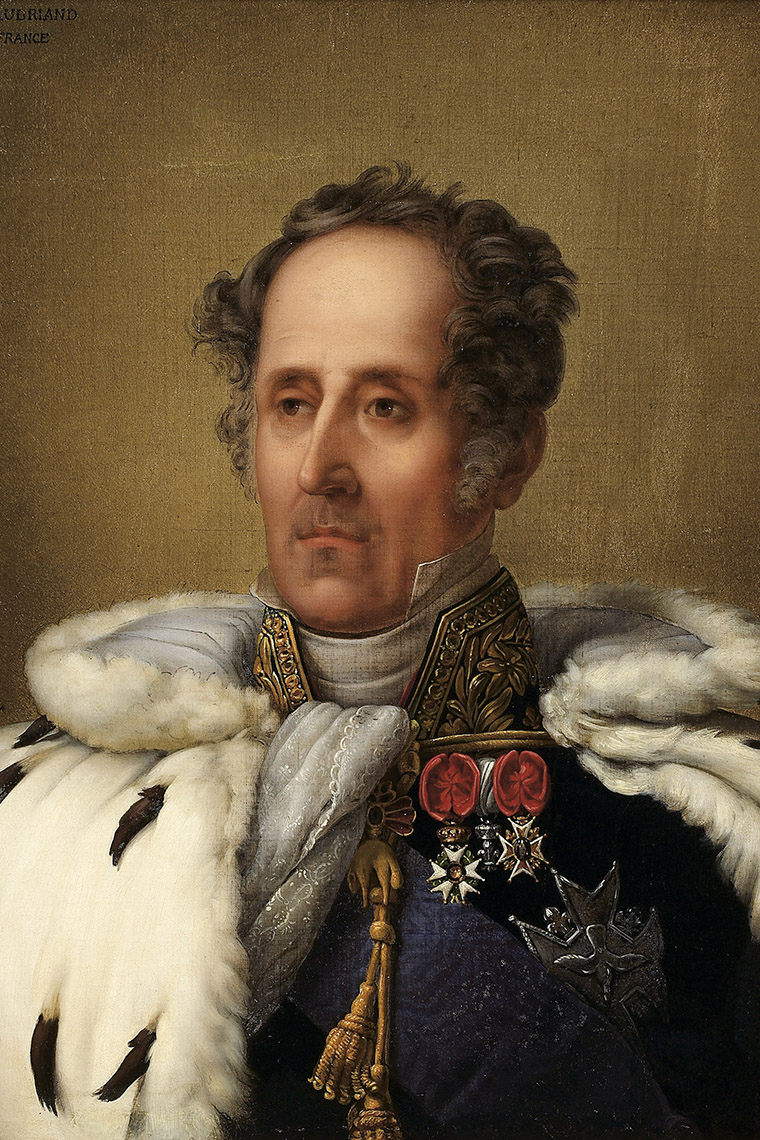
François-René de Chateaubriand (1768–1848) (by Pierre Louis Delaval)

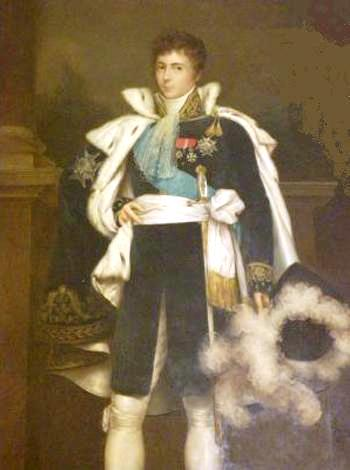
Anne-Victor-Denis Hurault (1767–1843), 7th Marquis of Vibraye

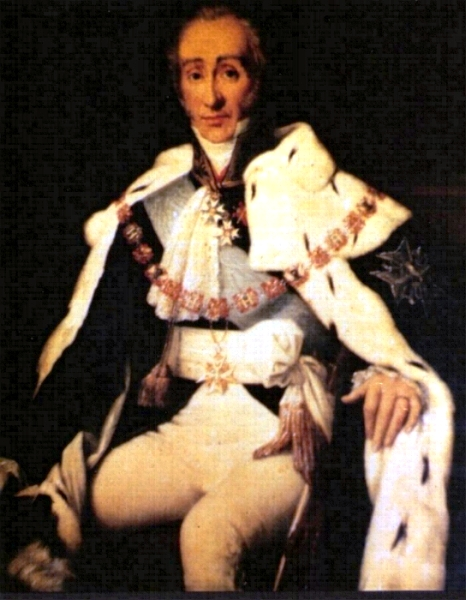
Louis Charles Pierre Bonaventure, Count of Mesnard (1769–1842)

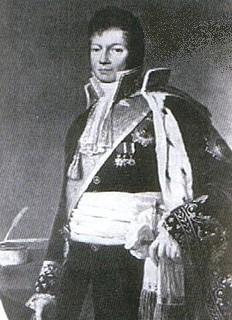
Gabriel d'Arjuzon (attributed to Jacques-Louis David)

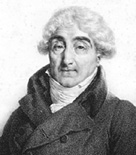
Raymond Desèze (1748–1828)

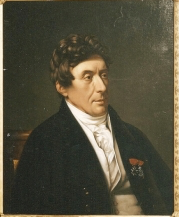
Louis Gabriel Ambroise, Vicomte de Bonald (1754-1840)

== See also ==
- Chamber of Most Worthy Peers
- House of Lords
