= Constitution of the Year X =

1802–1804 constitution of Napoleonic France

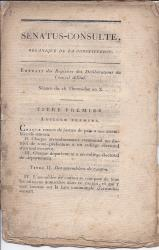
- Constitution of the Year X (1802)
- Original title: (in French) Constitution de l'an X
- Ratified: 1802
- Repealed: 1804
- Supersedes: Constitution of the Year VIII
- Superseded by: Constitution of the Year XII

The Constitution of the Year X (French: Constitution de l'an X) was a national constitution of France adopted during the Year X (10) on 16 Thermidor (4 August) of the French Revolutionary Calendar (1802 in the Gregorian calendar). It amended the Constitution of the Year VIII, revising the Consulate to augment Napoleon Bonaparte's authority by making him First Consul for Life.

Both the Constitution of the Year X and the Constitution of the Year VIII were further amended by the Constitution of the Year XII, which established the First French Empire with Napoleon as Emperor.
