= 1795 French legislative election =

- 12–21 October 1795

One-third of the seats in the Council of Five Hundred and the Council of Ancients
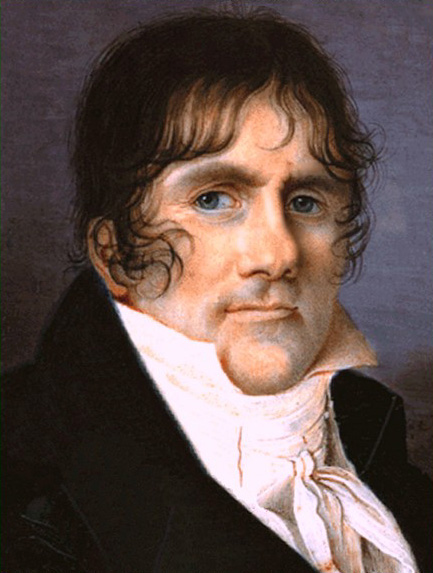

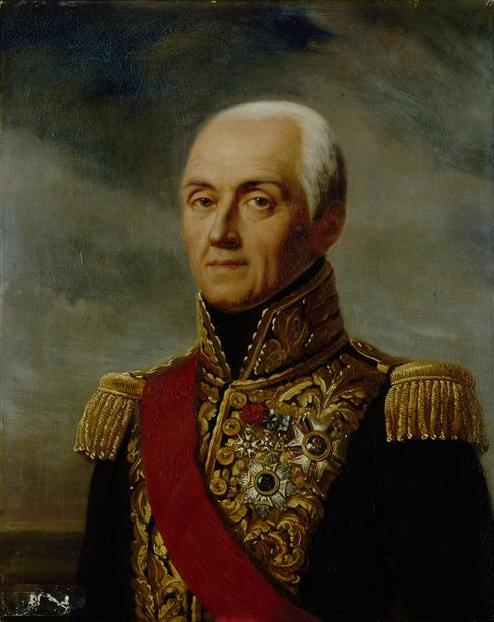

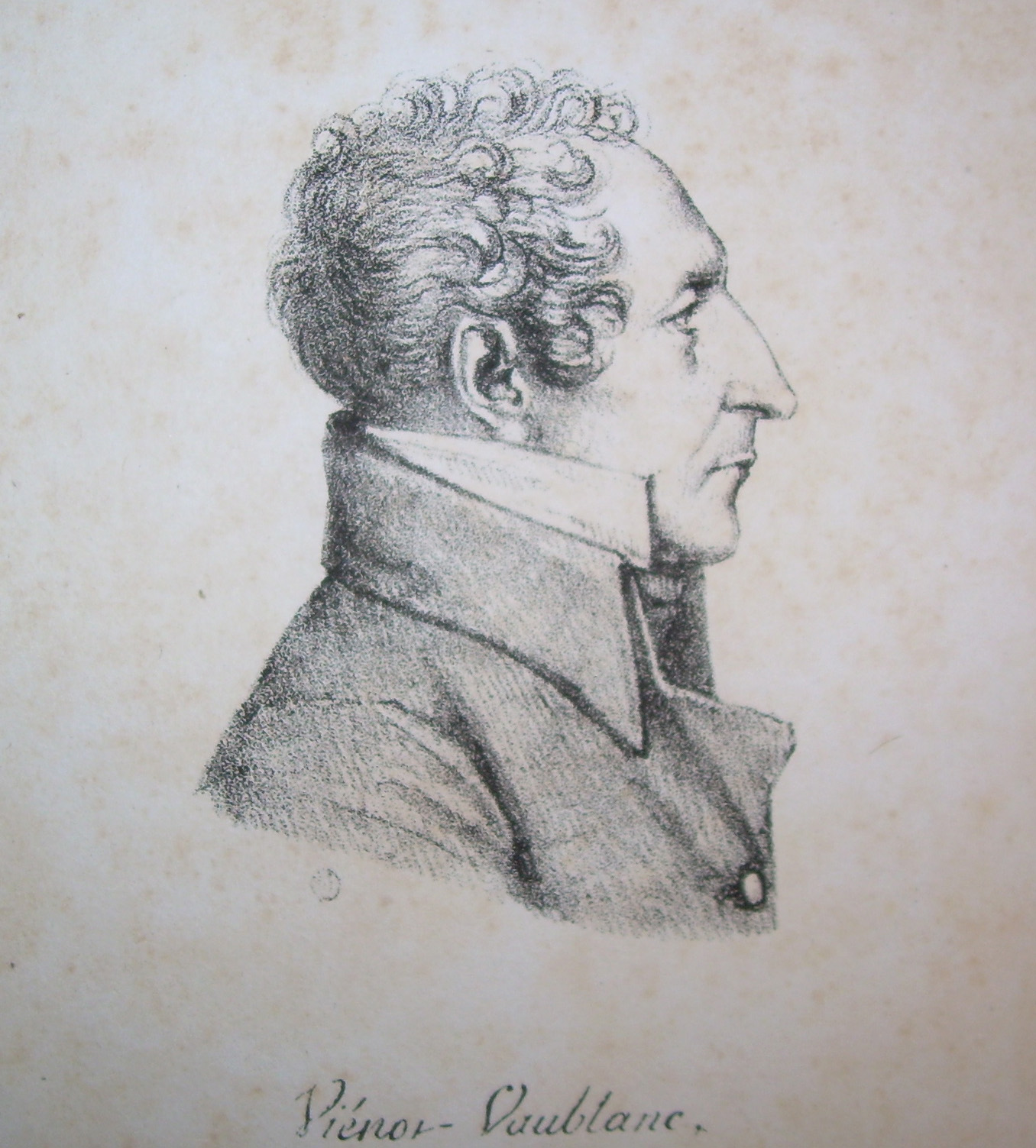
	First party	Second party	Third party
Leader	Paul Barras	Mathieu Dumas	Vincent-Marie Viénot de Vaublanc
Party	Thermidorians	Clichyens	Royalists
Seats won	63	54	33

Legislative elections were held in France between 12 and 21 October 1795 (20 to 29 Vendémiaire, Year IV) to elect one-third of the members of the Council of Five Hundred and the Council of Ancients, the lower and upper houses of the legislature. The elections were held in accordance with the Constitution of the Year III and the first under the French Directory.

== Background ==
During the summer of 1795, following the Thermidorian Reaction, members of the National Assembly began working on a new constitution that would not favour any certain party or group, while providing more support to centrists and moderates (later becoming the Plain) and avoiding any extreme use of power seen during the Reign of Terror of Maximilien Robespierre. Under the Constitution of the Year III, the Directory (Directoire) was established, which was a mix of the two former constitutions (1791 and 1793). The Directory was split into two branches (upper house, the Council of Ancients made up of independent senior politicians; and the lower house, the Council of Five Hundred, which was elected by land owning tax paying men), with a third executive (the Directory Body). The new system is seen by many historians as imitating the British parliamentary system, while expanding on what is now known as the French system of a separate executive and assembly, which work in conjunction (this being a mix of parliamentary and presidential known as semi-presidentialism).

With the approaching election, the Royalists (known collectively as the Monarchists) hope to take advantage of the elections and see a return to the monarchy and campaign together in many regions. Fearing a monarchist outcome, the Republicans (Jacobins, Thermidorians, and the Montagnards) passed a law, known as the two-thirds decree, which saw each of houses of the directory contain those many members from the convention. Following the 13 Vendémiaire royalist insurrection, the two-thirds principle became a hated law by members of the royalist and anti-radical parties.

== Results ==
1795 began seeing a large swing in support of constitutional royalists, now known as Clichyens, named after the Clichy Club, especially following the Reign of Terror and failures of the government of the French Constitution of 1793. Although the Royalists disagreed on who they would want to see as the proper pretender to the throne, they in fact agreed that legally being elected would be the only means which they would re-establish the monarchy; they would then call for the dissolution of the Directory but see the recreation of the French Constitution of 1791 with a new National Assembly. The Royalists were also divided on the future, with the Absolutists (later known as the Ultra-Royalists) preferring a return to the absolute ancien régime under Louis, Count of Provence (future Louis XVIII), and supported the now two-year old Quiberon expedition. The Constitutionalists (later represented by the Orléanists and known as the Liberals or Doctrinaires) favoured a constitutional monarchy supporting individual rights and property in addition to freedoms and fair elections. The constitutionalists later began meeting at the Clichy Club, hence the new name, in addition to their nickname, the Clichyens.

Party	Seats
Thermidorians	63
Clichyens	54
Royalists	33
Total	150
Source: Election-Politique

== Works cited ==
- Bertaud, Jean Paul (2004). La Révolution française. Paris: Perrin. ISBN 978-2-262-02305-8.
- Le Bozec, Christine (2014). La Première République, 1792 – 1799. Paris, France: Éditions Perrin. ISBN 978-2-262-04091-8. OCLC 871312113.
- Woronoff, Denis (2004). La République bourgeoise de Thermidor à Brumaire 1794-1799. France: Éditions du Seuil. ISBN 978-2-7578-4670-4. OCLC 1191043797.
