= Pierre Paul Royer-Collard =

French statesman and philosopher (1763–1845)

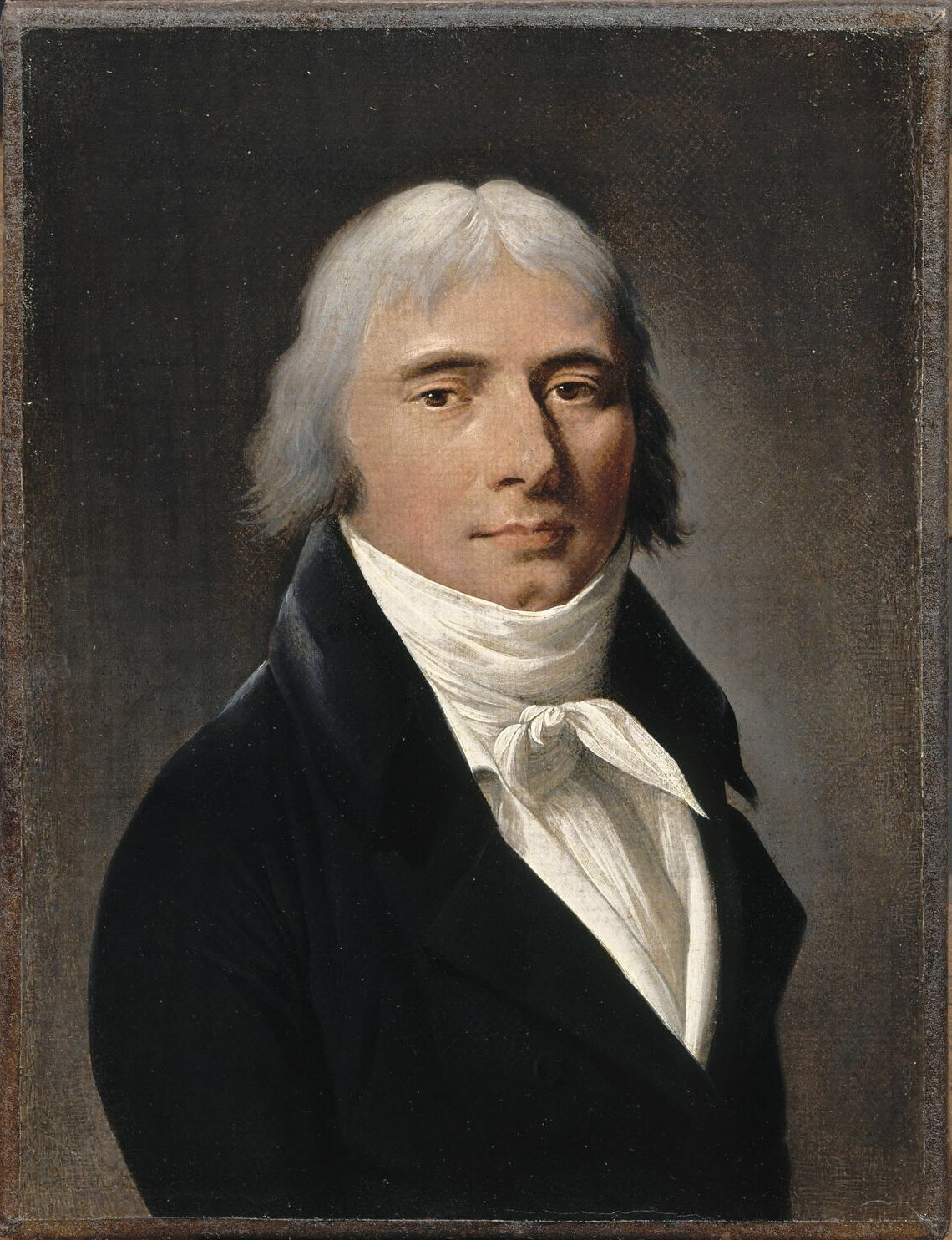
- Portrait by Louis-Léopold Boilly, 1819

President of the French Chamber of Deputies
- In office 25 May 1828 – 16 May 1830
- Preceded by: Auguste Ravez
- Succeeded by: Casimir Perier

Member of the French Chamber of Deputies
- In office 25 August 1815 – 5 July 1831
- Constituency: Marne

Member of the Council of Five Hundred
- In office 21 March 1797 – 4 September 1797
- Constituency: Marne

Councillor of the Paris Commune for the 4th arrondissement
- In office 20 July 1789 – 10 August 1792

Personal details
- Born: 21 June 1763 Sompuis, Champagne, France
- Died: 2 September 1845 (aged 82) Châteauvieux, Loir-et-Cher, France
- Party: Girondin (1791–1793); Clichyen (1794–1797); Legitimist (1797–1815); Doctrinaire (1815–1831)
- Spouse: Augustine de Forges de Chateaubrun
- Children: 4 children
- Education: Saint-Omer College
- Profession: Lawyer, teacher, philosopher

Pierre Paul Royer-Collard (French: [pjɛʁ pɔl ʁwaje kɔlaʁ]; 21 June 1763 – 2 September 1845) was a French statesman and philosopher, leader of the Doctrinaires group during the Bourbon Restoration (1814–1830).

== Biography ==
=== Early life ===
He was born at Sompuis, near Vitry-le-François (in modern-day Marne), the son of Anthony Royer, a small businessman. His mother, Angélique Perpétue Collard, had a reputation for strong character and great piety. His younger brother, Antoine-Athanase Royer-Collard, was a physician and pioneer in the field of psychiatry, at one point serving as chief physician at Charenton Asylum.

Royer-Collard was sent at 12 to the college of Chaumont of which his uncle, Father Paul Collard, was director. He subsequently followed his uncle to Saint-Omer, where he studied mathematics.

=== Career ===
At the outbreak of the French Revolution, to which he was passionately sympathetic, he was practising at the Parisian bar. He was returned by his section, the Island of Saint-Louis, to the Commune, of which he was secretary from 1790 to 1792. After the revolution of 10 August in that year he was replaced by Jean-Lambert Tallien.

His sympathies were now with the Gironde, and after the insurrection of the 12th Prairial (31 May 1793) his life was in danger. He returned to Sompuis, and was saved from arrest possibly by the protection of Georges Danton and in some degree by his mother's influence on the local commissary of the Convention. In 1797 he was returned by his department (Marne) to the Council of the Five Hundred, where he allied himself especially with Camille Jordan. He made a well-regarded speech in the council in defence of the principles of religious liberty, but the Coup of 18 Fructidor (4 September 1797) drove him back into private life.

It was at this period that he developed his legitimist opinions and entered into communication with the Comte de Provence (Louis XVIII). He was the ruling spirit in the small committee formed in Paris to help forward a Restoration independent of the Comte d'Artois and his party; but with the establishment of the Consulate he saw the prospects of the monarchy were temporarily hopeless, and the members of the committee resigned. From that time until the Restoration Royer-Collard devoted himself exclusively to the study of philosophy. He derived his opposition to the philosophy of Étienne Bonnot de Condillac chiefly from the study of René Descartes and his followers, and from his early veneration for the fathers of Port-Royal. He was occupied with developing a system to provide a moral and political education consonant with his view of the needs of France. From 1811 to 1814 he lectured at the Sorbonne. He was strongly influenced by the Scottish philosopher Thomas Reid, and in 1811-12 he lectured on Reid at the École Normale.

From this time dates his long association with François Guizot. Royer-Collard himself was supervisor of the press under the first restoration. From 1815 onwards he sat as deputy for Marne in the chamber. As president of the commission of public instruction from 1815 to 1820 he checked the pretensions of the clerical party, the immediate cause of his retirement being an attempt to infringe the rights of the University of Paris by awarding diplomas, independent of university examinations, to the teaching fraternity of the Christian Brothers. Royer-Collard's acceptance of the legitimist principle did not prevent a faithful adhesion to the social revolution effected in 1789, and he protested in 1815, in 1820, and again under the Monarchy of July against laws of exception.

He was the moving spirit of the "Doctrinaires", as they were called, who met at the house of the Comte de Ste Aulaire and in the salon of Madame de Staël's daughter, the duchesse de Broglie. The leaders of the party, beside Royer-Collard, were Guizot, PFH de Serre, Camille Jordan and Charles de Rémusat. In 1820 Royer-Collard was excluded from the Council of State by a decree signed by his former ally Serre. In 1827 he was elected for seven constituencies, but remained faithful to his native department. Next year he became president of the chamber, and fought against the reactionary policy which precipitated the Revolution of July. It was Royer-Collard who in March 1830 presented the address of the 221. From that time he took no active part in politics, although he retained his seat in the chamber until 1839. Whilst during the first half of the nineteenth century the word "liberal" was generally synonymous with Voltaireanism and hostility to the Jesuits, certain speeches of Royer-Collard quoted by Barante show that he professed a deferential attachment for the Church. "If Christianity", he wrote, "has been a degradation, a corruption, Voltaire in attacking it has been a benefactor of the human race; but if the contrary be true, then the passing of Voltaire over the Christian earth has been a great calamity." In a letter to Père de Ravignan he comments upon the institution of the Jesuits as a "wonderful creation".

=== Personal life ===
Royer-Collard married Augustine Marie Rosalie de Forges de Chãtaeubrun on 20 October 1800. They had four children, two of whom predeceased them.

He died at his estate of Châteauvieux in the Berry, south of Blois.
