= Club de Clichy =

Clichy Club Club de Clichy
- Leader: François-Marie de Barthélemy; Pierre Paul Royer-Collard; Guillaume-Mathieu Dumas; Camille Jordan; Amédée Willot
- Founded: 28 July 1794; 232 years ago
- Banned: 5 September 1797; 229 years ago
- Preceded by: Feuillant Club
- Ideology: Anti-abolitionism; Conservatism; Laissez-faire; Monarchism
- Political position: Right-wing
- Colours: Blue
- Politics of France; Political parties; Elections; Means of revenues were several aristocrats such as Charles Maurice de Talleryrand, Germaine de Staël and Prince of Condé

The Clichy Club (French: Club de Clichy) was a political group active during the French Revolution from 1794 to 1797.

== History ==
During the French Revolution, the Clichy Club formed in 1794 following the fall of Maximilien Robespierre, 9 Thermidor an II (27 July 1794). The political club that came to be called the Clichyens met in rooms in the rue de Clichy, which led west towards the fashionable Parisian suburb of Clichy. The club was initially constituted around the dismissed deputés of the National Convention, most of whom had been imprisoned during the Reign of Terror. Under the French Directorate, they began to play an increasingly important role on the political right, embracing moderatism republicans and monarchists, namely those who still believed that in a constitutional monarchy based in part on the British model lay the best future for France. The main Clichyens were François Antoine de Boissy d'Anglas, Jean-Charles Pichegru and Camille Jordan. Among other members were Guillaume-Mathieu Dumas, Pierre Paul Royer-Collard and General Amédée Willot. With the closure of the Jacobin Club in November 1794, the danger from the political left appeared to subside and moderates drifted away from the Clichy Club, which was dormant for several years.

Under the Directorate, the salons of Paris began cautiously to reconvene under the guidance of women whose fortunes had not been ruined during the Revolution's first decade—the private sphere became politicized "one of the few sanctuaries of free exchange" observes the historian of the salons as a political force as the public sphere was not free. Within the span of political opinion, those members of the Clichy Club who figured among the Monarchiens signalled their party loyalties in the long black waistcoats they wore. Madame de Staël attempted in her salon mixte to bridge the social and political differences between the Monarchiens of the Clichy Club and factions who were more securely associated with the new regime, such as those who congregated with Benjamin Constant at the Hôtel de Salm or in Charles Maurice de Talleyrand-Périgord's circle.

In a rearguard reaction to preserve the rapidly dissolving powers of the Directorate in the face of public opinion, after 205 of 216 conventionnels who ran for re-election in 1797 were rejected by the limited group of enfranchised voters (though two of the Clichyens were seated), the extremists among the Clichy Club were intent on turning out the Directors and repealing Revolutionary legislation, especially that directed against the returned émigrés and the Catholic Church.

The Clichy Club seemed to be in a position to dominate the Council of Five Hundred through the newly elected deputies. Divisions among the group pitted about 80 intransigent partisans for the return of monarchy, headed by Jean-Louis Gibert des Molières, against moderates around Mathieu Dumas, who avoided confrontations with the five-man Directorate. The apex of the Clichyens' influence was in the election to the Directorate of François-Marie, marquis de Barthélemy.

Napoleon Bonaparte's reaction was a proclamation to the army denouncing the Clichyens and matters rapidly evolved in the coup d'état of 18 Fructidor. On 3 September 1797, a royalist conspiracy was announced and the following morning Pichegru, still in correspondence with the Prince de Condé, was among those arrested. However, few others among the Clichyens were in such treasonable relations with the royalist pretender and his advisors. On the fifth, he was among those ordered for deportation to Guyane and the new party rapidly consolidated its power. Among its first actions was to close and ban the Clichy Club, though it hesitated to treat other more private salons—though kept under close police surveillance—as political associations, which the Directorate had previously banned as "private associations occupying themselves with political questions".

In the history of slavery, the Clichyens's nucleus of French colonial planters coordinated a common voice against abolition as detrimental to the French colonies. Public statements of the Clichy Club generally appeared in the right-wing press, L'Éclair, Le Véridique, Le Messager du soir and Les nouvelles politiques.

== Electoral results ==
Council of Five Hundred
Election year	No. of overall votes	% of overall vote	No. of overall seats won	+/–	Leader
1795	Unknown (2nd)	36	160 / 500	–	Boissy d'Anglas
1797	Unknown (1st)	59	387 / 657	▲227	Boissy d'Anglas
