= 1798 French legislative election =

- 9–18 April 1798

298 seats in the Council of Five Hundred and 139 seats in the Council of Ancients
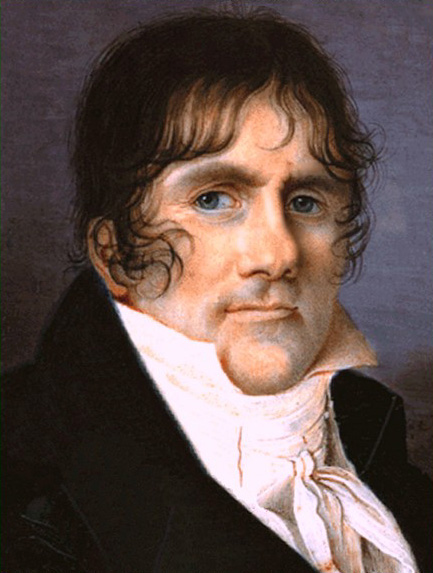

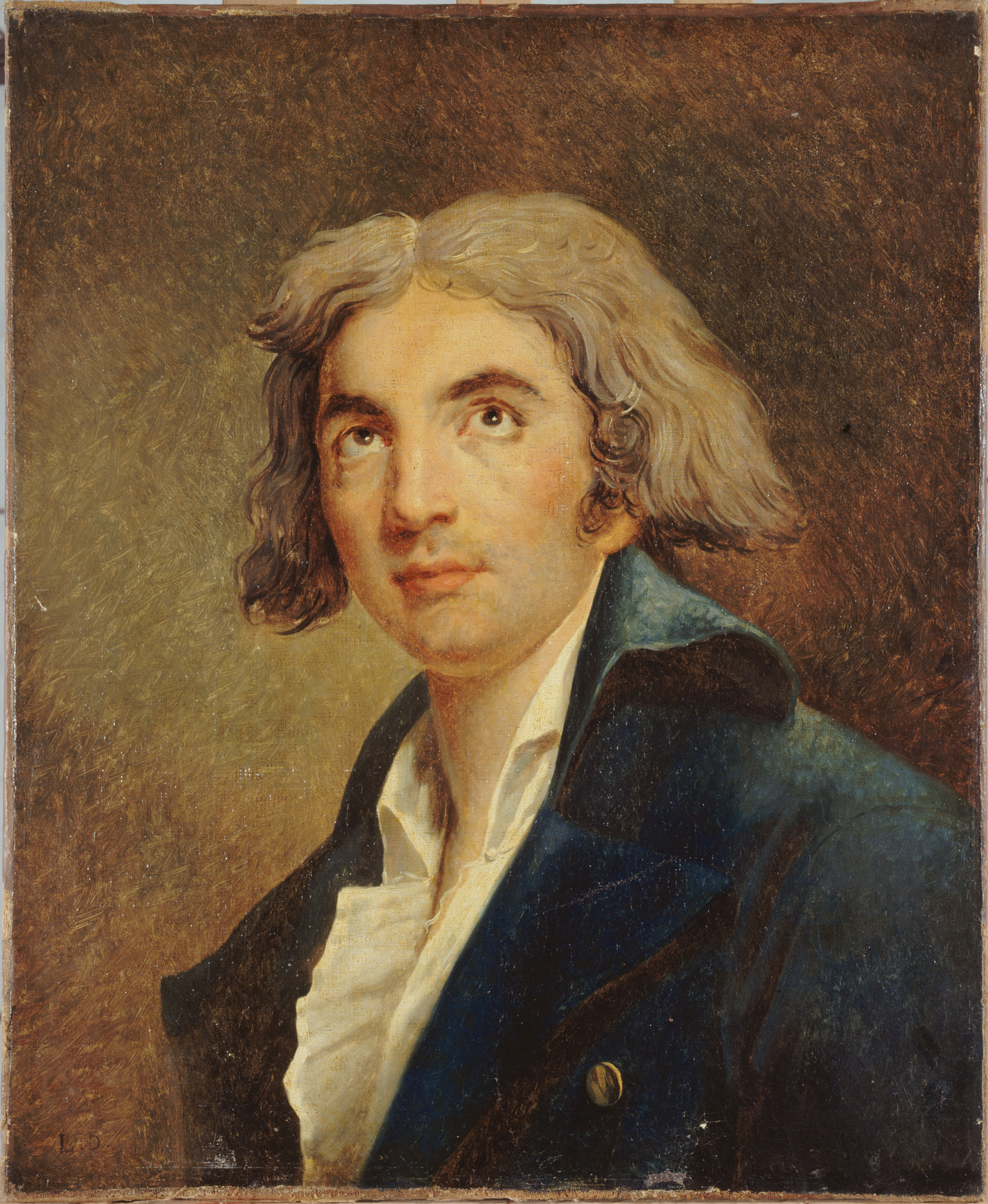
	First party	Second party
Leader	Paul Barras	Marie-Joseph Chénier
Party	Thermidorians	Jacobins
Seats after	387	175
Seat change	▲107	▲105
President of the Council of Five Hundred before election
Jacques Antoine Creuzé-Latouche
Jacobin Club
Elected President of the Council of Five Hundred
Marie-Joseph Chénier

Legislative elections were held in France between 9 and 18 April 1798 to elect one-third of the members of the Council of Five Hundred and the Council of Ancients, the lower and upper houses of the legislature, as well as 201 vacant seats. They marked the beginning of the end of the French far-left and rise of the anti-Montagnard and anti-Jacobin groupings. The 1798 elections were partially invalidated by the passage of the Law of 22 Floréal Year VI which saw 106 Montagnards lose their seats by decree of the Council of Five Hundred.

== Background ==
After the Coup of 18 Fructidor Year V, which saw the union of pro-Republican French parties (The Mountain, Jacobins, and Thermidorians), faced with the threat of a Bourbon restoration, the reconstitution of the 'clubs' was authorised. With the new 'constitutional circles', these clubs helped public authorities to rid any 'Monarchists' and support the Republican defence policy. However, this partially led to a backfire when terrorists, Babouvists, and supporters of the Constitution of the Year III, began attacking the Monarchists leading to open attacks in the streets, leading to the downfall of the extremist Jacobin club and rise of the moderate Thermidorians.

In order to prevent further monarchist gains, the new 'coup assembly' organised several laws by working with the Council of Ancients which would see a reduction of the royalist supporters. Among the many laws passed was the 'one thirds' vote, in which only one third of the assembly would be up for 're-election' while the other 2/3rd would be 'up for election' but the vote wouldn't really count. This was passed in the lower house, but when moved to the Ancients, it was denied by a very large majority and the law thrown away.

== Results ==
The election of 1798 saw one-third of the legislative body up for election, or about 236 of the conventional members from 1795, as well as 190 seats vacant since the coup, and 11 seats of those who have died or resigned, leaving a total of 437 deputies. 298 seats are to be renewed in the Council of Five Hundred and 139 in the Council of Ancients.

Voter turnout fell, with just 20% of the eligible population voting, compared to 23% in 1797 and later 11.5% in 1799. The massive abstention is almost entirely in-part due to the support of the moderate and royalist parties which had been ousted following the coup.

Throughout France however, the local departmental and 'mother assemblies' of the regions become dominated by pro-Monarchy parties or the new 'pro-directorial' party (known today as the Thermidorians). Not only are the smaller regions owned by the monarchists, but more than 27 electoral assemblies are now also controlled by monarchists (these assemblies would elect their deputies to the assembly).

In the smaller departments however, the results are the opposite, with the regions of Pyrénées-Atlantiques and Pyrénées-Orientales, Massif Central, Bouches-du-Rhône, Doubs, Sarthe, Seine, and some 40 other departments voting for the neo-Jacobins (the moderate faction of the Jacobins). Five departments opt for the monarchists. The directionals also had good results in the Eastern, Western, and eastern edge of the Massif Central. On the other hand, however, many of the remaining departments have assemblies which are split and/or indecisive in achieving a majority.

Among the many new neo-Jacobins elected, includes Lucien Bonaparte, Bertrand Barère and Jean-Baptiste Robert Lindet. In the councils, out of a total of 807 representatives, the groups are now distributed as follows: 387 directorials (107 more and a gain of 38% compared to Year V), 175 Jacobins (105 more) and 245 independents or undetermined. The Directory retains a majority of around 400 deputies in the councils, but the threat of another defeat in the 1799 elections makes the results unacceptable.
