= François Antoine de Boissy d'Anglas =

French nobleman, writer, lawyer and statesman

Count François Boissy d'Anglas
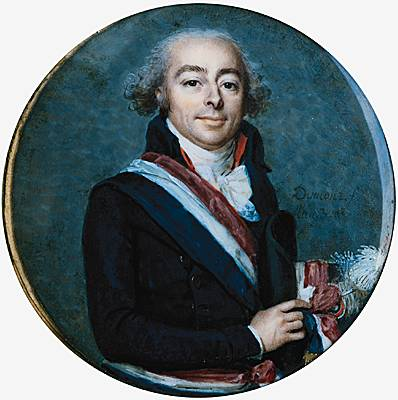
- François Boissy d'Anglas by François Dumont (1795, Louvre Palace)

Peer of France
- In office August 1815 – 20 October 1826
- Monarchs: Louis XVIII; Charles X

Member of Conservative Senate
- In office 18 February 1804 – 14 April 1814
- Monarch: Napoleon I

Member of the Council of Five Hundred
- In office 2 November 1795 – 5 September 1797
- Constituency: Ardèche

Member of National Convention
- In office 20 September 1792 – 2 November 1795
- Constituency: Ardèche

Member of the Estates-General for the Third Estate
- In office 7 January 1789 – 9 July 1789
- Constituency: Annonay

Personal details
- Born: 8 December 1756 Saint-Jean-Chambre, France
- Died: 20 October 1826 (aged 69) Paris, France
- Resting place: Père Lachaise Cemetery
- Party: Girondist (1792–1793); Maraisard (1793–1795); Clichyens (1795–1797); Independent (1799–1826)
- Spouse: Marie-Françoise Michel (m. 1776)
- Children: 4 children
- Profession: Writer, lawyer

François-Antoine de Boissy d'Anglas, Count of the Empire (1756–1826) was a French writer, lawyer and politician during the Revolution and the Empire.

== Biography ==
=== Early career ===
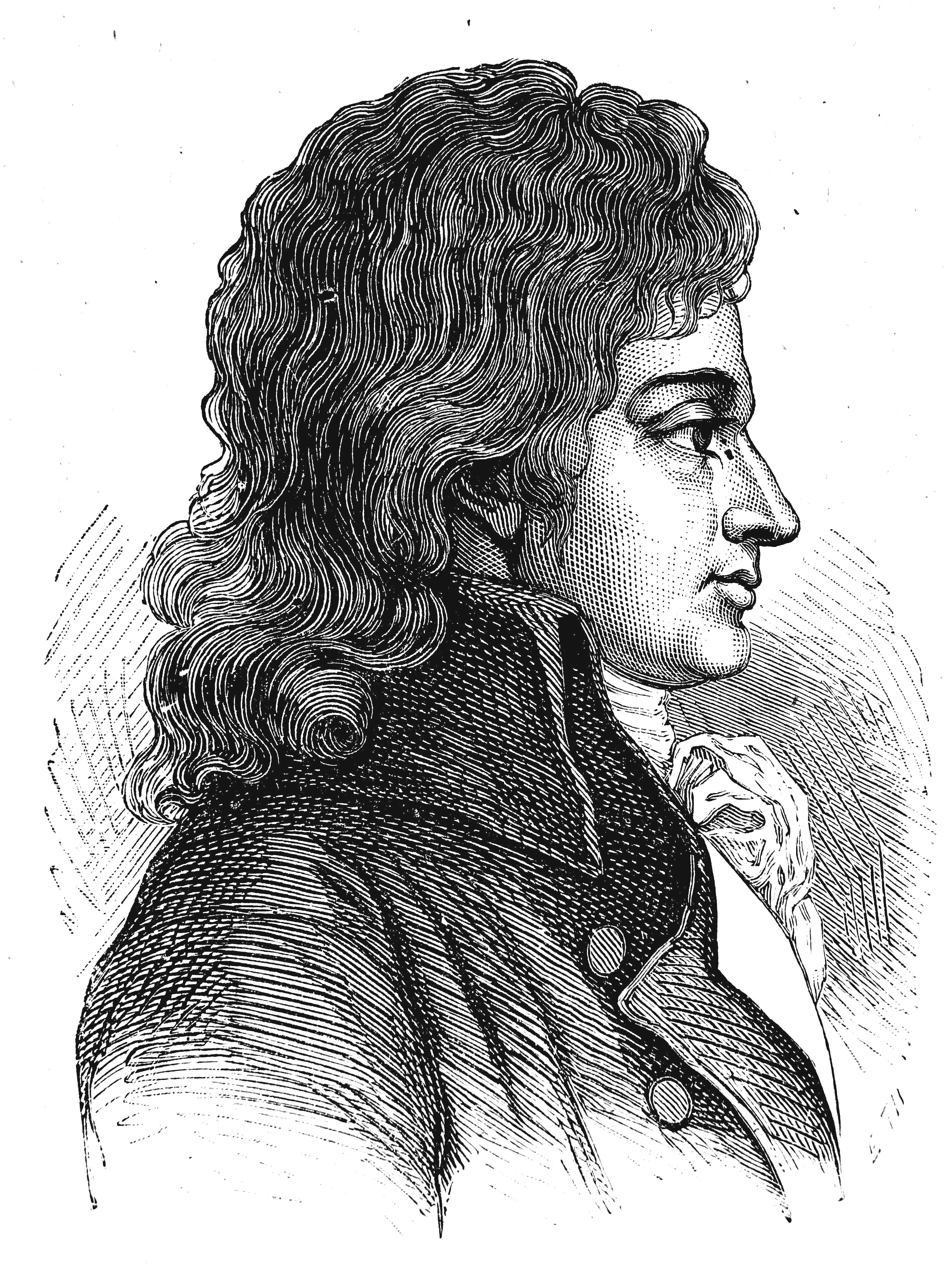
Boissy d'Anglas in his youth.

Born to a Protestant family in Saint-Jean-Chambre, Ardèche, he studied Law and, after literary attempts, became a lawyer to the parlement of Paris.

In 1789 he was elected by the Third Estate of the sénéchaussee of Annonay as deputy to the Estates-General. He was one of those who induced the Estates-General to proclaim itself a National Assembly on 17 June 1789, and approved, in several speeches, of the storming of the Bastille and of the taking of the royal family to Paris (October 1789).

Boissy d'Anglas demanded that strict measures be taken against the Royalists who were conspiring in Southern France, and published some pamphlets on financial issues. During the Legislative Assembly, he was procureur-syndic for the directory of the département of Ardèche.

=== During the Revolution ===
Elected to the National Convention, he sat in the centre, le Marais, voting in the trial of Louis XVI for his detention until deportation should be judged expedient for the state. He was then representative on mission to Lyon, charged with investigating frauds in connection with the supplies of the Army of the Alps.

Although he had been close to several Girondists, Boissy d'Anglas escaped arrest after François Hanriot's insurrection of 2 June 1793, and he was one of several centrist deputies who supported Maximilien Robespierre during the early stages of the Reign of Terror. However, he was gained over by the members of The Mountain hostile to Robespierre, and his support, along with that of some other leaders of the Marais, made possible the Thermidorian Reaction.

Boissy d'Anglas was then elected a member of the Committee of Public Safety, and charged with the superintendence of the provisioning of Paris. He presented the report supporting the decree of 3 Ventôse of the year III (February 1795), which established freedom of religion. In the critical days of Germinal and of Prairial of the year III, he was noted for his courage.

On 12 Germinal, the day of insurrection of 12 Germinal year III, he was in the tribune, reading a report on the food supplies, when the hall of the convention was invaded; when they withdrew he quietly continued where he had been interrupted. During Insurrection of 1 Prairial, he was presiding over the convention, and remained in his post despite insults and menaces of the insurgents. When the head of the deputy, Jean-Bertrand Féraud, was presented to him on the end of a pike, he saluted it impassively.

=== Under the Directory ===
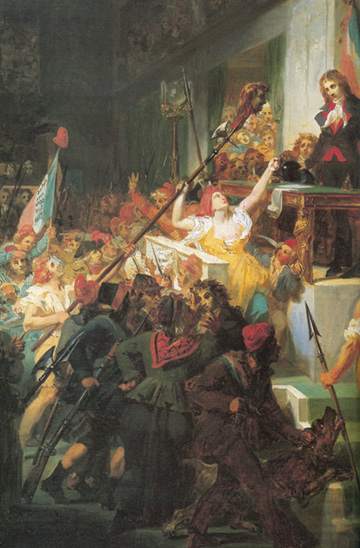
Boissy saluting Féraud's head by Alexandre-Évariste Fragonard (1831)

He was protractor of the committee which drew up the Constitution of the Year III which established the French Directory; his report shows apprehension of a return of the Reign of Terror, and presents reactionary measures as precautions against the re-establishment of "tyranny and anarchy". This report, the proposal that he made (27 August 1795) to lessen the severity of the revolutionary laws, and the eulogies he received from several Paris sections suspected of Royalism, resulted in his being obliged to justify himself (15 October 1795).

As a member of the Council of Five Hundred, Boissy d'Anglas became more and more suspected of Royalism himself. He presented a measure in favour of full liberty for the press, which at that time was almost unanimously reactionary, protested against the outlawry of returned émigrés, spoke in favour of the deported priests and attacked the Directory. Accordingly, he was proscribed immediately after the coup of 18 Fructidor, and lived in Great Britain until the establishment of the French Consulate.

=== Later life ===
In 1801 he was made a member of the Tribunate, and in 1805 a senator of the Empire. In 1814 he voted for Napoleon's abdication, which won for him a seat in the Chamber of Peers after the First Bourbon Restoration. However, during the Hundred Days he returned to serving Napoleon. After the defeat at Waterloo and the subsequent abdication of Napoleon, 1815 Boissy d'Anglas was one of the five commissioners sent by the Provisional Government to try to negotiate peace terms with the Duke of Wellington and Prince Blücher. For his disloyalty to Louis XVIII, on the Second Restoration, he was for a short while excluded.

In the Chamber he still sought to obtain liberty for the press —a theme upon which he published a volume of his speeches (Paris, 1817). He was a member of the Institut de France from its foundation, and in 1816, after its reorganization, became a member of the Académie des Inscriptions et Belles-Lettres. He published in 1819–1821 a two-volume Essai sur la vie et les opinions de M. de Malesherbes.

== Family and children ==
He married Marie-Françoise Michel (Nîmes, 6 January 1759 – Bougival, 21 March 1850) on 11 March 1776 in Vauvert. They had four children:

- Marie-Anne (17 February 1777 – October 1855)
- Suzanne (14 October 1779 – 6 March 1851)
- François-Antoine Jr. (23 February 1781 – 12 November 1850), prefect of Charente
- Jean-Gabriel (2 April 1783 – 6 May 1864), Orléanist politician

== Bibliography ==
- Deux mots sur une question jugée ou lettre de M. Boissy d'Anglas à Monsieur le rédacteur de la Feuille du jour en réponse à Monsieur de La Gallissonnière (1791)
- Observations sur l'ouvrage de M. de Calonne, intitulé De l'état de la France, présent et à venir, et à son occasion, sur les principaux actes de l'Assemblée nationale (1791)
- Quelques idées sur la liberté, la révolution, le gouvernement républicain, et la constitution françoise (1792)
- Essai sur les fêtes nationales, suivi de quelques idées sur les arts et sur la nécessité de les encourager (1793)
- Projet de constitution pour la République française, et discours préliminaire (1795). Vertaald als: Vertoog bij de aanbieding van het ontwerp van constitutie, voor de Fransche Republiek, 1796
- Rapport sur les colonies (1795)
- Rapport sur la liberté des cultes, fait au nom des comités de salut public, de sureté générale et de législation, réunis ... (1795)
- Recueil de discours sur la liberté de la presse (1817)
- Essai sur la vie, les écrits et les opinions de M. de Malesherbes, 3 dln. (1819–1821)
- Les études littéraires et poétiques d'un vieillard, ou Recueil de divers écrits en vers et en prose. Tome premier; Tome second; Tome troisième; Tome quatrième; Tome cinqième; Tome sixième (1825)
