= Joseph-Claude Drevon =

French politician

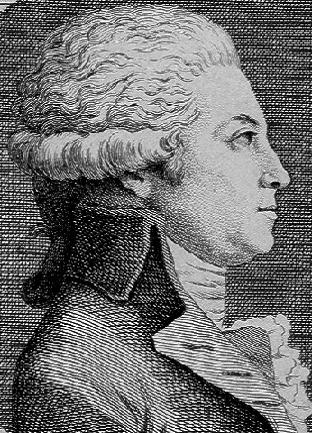
- Born: 29 September 1747; Lyon, France
- Died: 14 November 1823 (aged 76); Langres, France
- Occupation: Politician

Joseph-Claude Drevon (29 September 1747 - 14 November 1823) was a French politician. He served as a member of the National Constituent Assembly from 3 November 1789 to 30 September 1791, the National Convention from 4 September 1792 to 5 September 1792, and the Council of Five Hundred from 23 March 1799 au 26 December 1799, representing Marne.
