= Law of 22 Floréal Year VI =

Law constituting a bloodless coup against the Left in Revolutionary France

The Law of 22 Floréal Year VI (loi du 22 floréal an VI) was a law—arguably constituting a bloodless coup—passed on 11 May 1798 (22 Floréal Year VI by the French Republican Calendar) by which 106 left-wing deputies were deprived of their seats in the Council of Five Hundred, the lower house of the legislature under the French Directory. Following the Coup of Fructidor, the power of the Monarchists and the Royalists was largely broken; however, in order to do this, the Directory needed to rely on support from the Left.

In order to capitalise on the subsequent situation within the government, the parties of the Left such as the Montagnards and the Jacobins united together. They criticised the Directory for the reintroduction of indirect taxes and other economic policies that were seen as remnants of the ancien regime. Many Jacobin deputies also criticised the Directory for allowing generals in the war to enrich themselves from the occupation of territories such as Italy and the Rhine. In response, the Directory shut down eleven Jacobin newspapers.

Despite these efforts of suppression, the 1798 French legislative election resulted in the Left controlling 106 seats in the National Assembly and the president of the Council of Five Hundred becoming Marie-Joseph Chénier. As a reaction to these successes, the Directory convinced the Council of Five Hundred to annul the elections results in 53 departments, leading to almost 130 deputies losing their seats. These were then replaced by individuals chosen by the Directory.
