= 1795 French referendums =

Two referendums held in France in 1795

Two referendums were held in France on 6 September 1795: one adopting the Constitution of the Year III establishing the Directory, and another on the Two-Thirds Decree reserving two-thirds of the seats in the new Council of Five Hundred and Council of Ancients for former members of the National Convention.

== Constitutional Referendum ==
The official result was more than 95% in favor of the new constitution.

French constitutional referendum, 1795
Choice	Votes	%
For	1,057,390	95.49
Against	49,978	4.51
Total	1,107,368	100.00
Registered voters/turnout		15.82

In national elections only tax paying men over 25 could vote, which limited electorate to approximately 5-7 million people; although, to vote for the members of the legislature you had to pay a direct tax that equated to about 150-200 labour days

== Two-Thirds Decree Referendum ==
Of the seven million eligible voters, only 4.49% of voters cast valid votes.

Two-Thirds Decree referendum, 1795
Choice	Votes	%
For	205,498	65.39
Against	108,754	34.61
Total	314,252	100.00
Registered voters/turnout		4.49
