= Châteauvieux, Loir-et-Cher =

Châteauvieux
- Commune
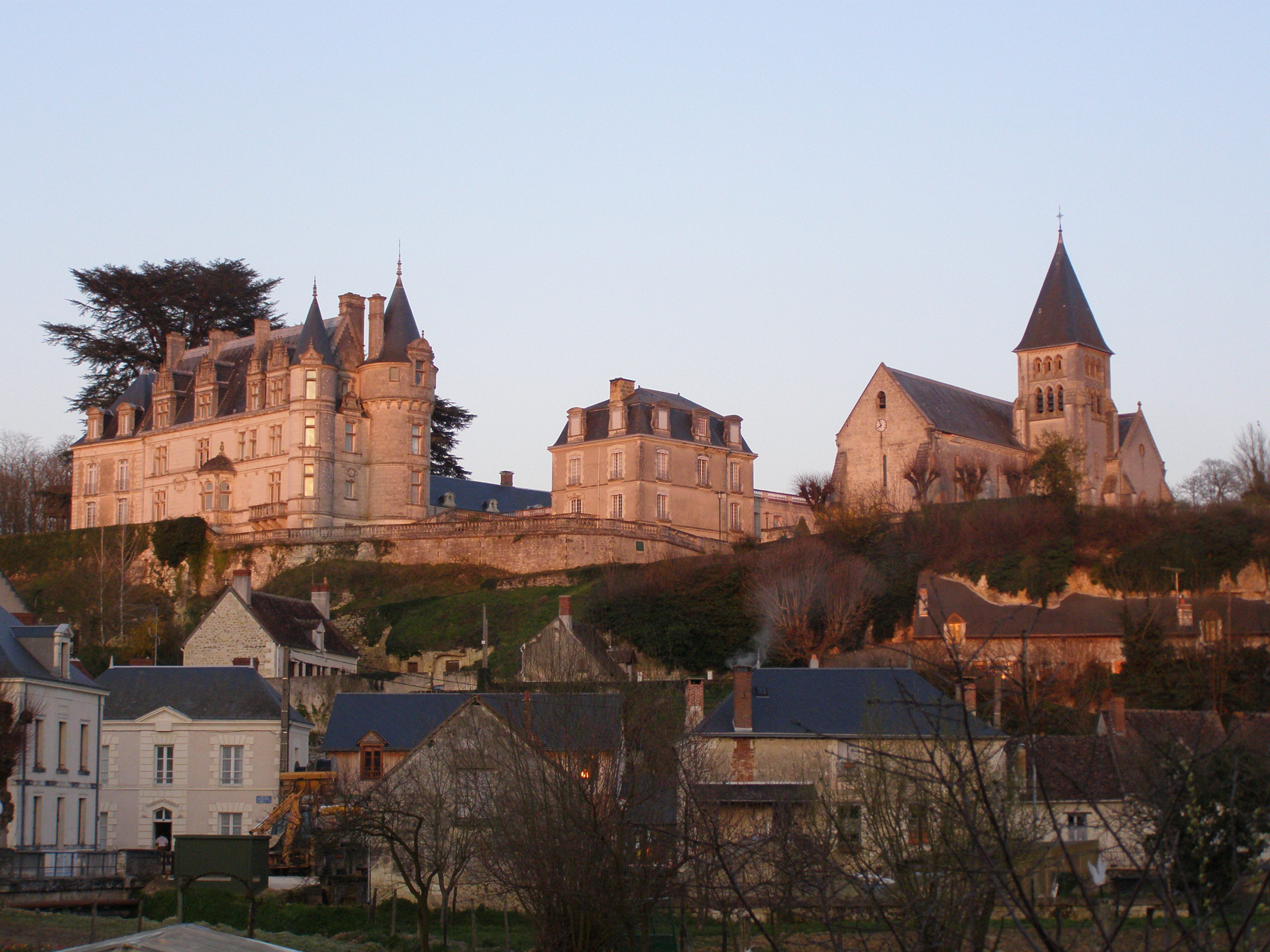
- Castle Chateauvieux

- Coat of arms
- Location of Châteauvieux
- Location within France Location within Centre-Val de Loire
- Coordinates: 47°13′50″N 1°23′02″E
- Country: France
- Region: Centre-Val de Loire
- Department: Loir-et-Cher
- Arrondissement: Romorantin-Lanthenay
- Canton: Saint-Aignan
- Intercommunality: Val-de-Cher-Controis

Government
  - Mayor (2020–2026): Christian Saux
- Area^{1}: 33.48 km^{2} (12.93 sq mi)
- Elevation: 90 m (300 ft)
- Highest elevation: 160 m (520 ft)
- Lowest elevation: 79 m (259 ft)
- Population (2023): 514
  - Density: 15.4/km^{2} (39.8/sq mi)
- Time zone: UTC+01:00 (CET)
  - Summer (DST): UTC+02:00 (CEST)
- INSEE/Postal code: 41042 /41110
- ^{1} French Land Register data, which excludes lakes, ponds, glaciers > 1 km^{2} (0.386 sq mi or 247 acres) and river estuaries.

Châteauvieux (French pronunciation: [ʃɑtovjø]) is a commune in the Loir-et-Cher department, central France.

== Population ==
Historical population
Year	Pop.	±% p.a.
1968	727	—
1975	629	−2.05%
1982	660	+0.69%
1990	584	−1.52%
1999	575	−0.17%
2007	549	−0.58%
2012	550	+0.04%
2017	538	−0.44%
2023	514	−0.76%
Source: INSEE

== Sights ==
The church of Saint-Hilaire was mostly built in the 13th century in the Plantagenet Gothic style characterised by the cross ribbed cup-shaped vaulting.

== See also ==
- Communes of the Loir-et-Cher department
