= Camille Jordan (politician) =

French politician (1771–1821)

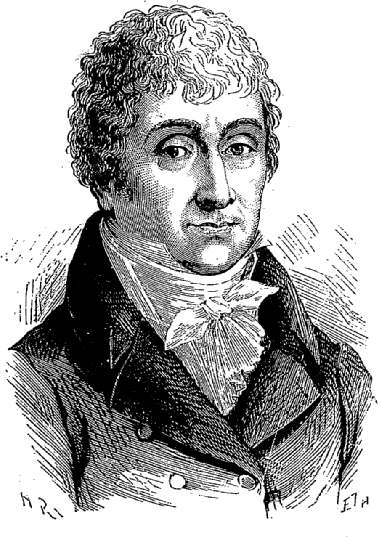
Camille Jordan (politician)

Camille Jordan (11 January 1771 in Lyon – 19 May 1821) was a French politician born in Lyon of a well-to-do mercantile family.

Jordan was educated in Lyon, and from an early age was imbued with royalist principles. He actively supported by voice, pen, and musket his native town in its resistance to the Convention, and when Lyon fell, in October 1793, Jordan fled. From Switzerland he passed in six months to England, where he formed acquaintances with other French exiles and with prominent British statesmen, and imbibed a lasting admiration for the English Constitution.

In 1796 he returned to France, and next year he was sent by Lyon as a deputy to the Council of the Five Hundred. There, his eloquence won him consideration. He earnestly supported what he felt to be true freedom, especially in matters of religious worship, though the energetic appeal on behalf of church bells in his Rapport sur la liberté des cultes procured him the sobriquet of "Jordan-Cloche". Proscribed at the coup d'état of the 18th Fructidor (4 September 1797), he escaped to Basel. Thence he went to Germany, where he met Goethe.

Back again in France by 1800, he boldly published in 1802 his Vrai sens du vote national pour le consulat à vie, in which he exposed the ambitious schemes of Bonaparte. He was unmolested, however, and during the First Empire lived in literary retirement at Lyon with his wife and family, producing for the Lyon academy occasional papers on the Influence réciproque de l'éloquence sur la Révolution et de la Révolution sur l'éloquence; Etudes sur Klopstock, etc.

At the restoration in 1814, he again emerged into public life. By Louis XVIII he was ennobled and named a councillor of state; and from 1816 he sat in the chamber of deputies as representative of Am. At first, he supported the ministry, but when they began to show signs of reaction, he separated from them, and gradually came to be at the head of the constitutional opposition. His speeches in the chamber were always eloquent and powerful. Though warned by failing health to resign, Camille Jordan remained at his post till his death at Paris, on 19 May 1821.

To his pen we owe Lettre à M. Laniourette (1791); Histoire de la conversion d'une dame parisienne (1792); La Loi et la religion vengées (1792); Adresse à ses commettants sur la Révolution du 4 Septembre 1797 (I797); Sur les troubles de Lyon (1818); La Session de 1817 (1818). His Discours were collected in 1818. The "Fragments choisis," and translations from the German, were published in L'Abeille française. Besides the histories of the time, see further details vol. x. of the Revue encyclopédique; a paper on Jordan and Madame de Staël, by Charles Augustin Sainte-Beuve, in the Revue des deux mondes for March 1868 and R Boubbe, "Camille Jordan à Weimar," in the Correspondance (1901), ccv. 718–738 and 948–970.
