= Saint-Jean-Chambre =

- Commune
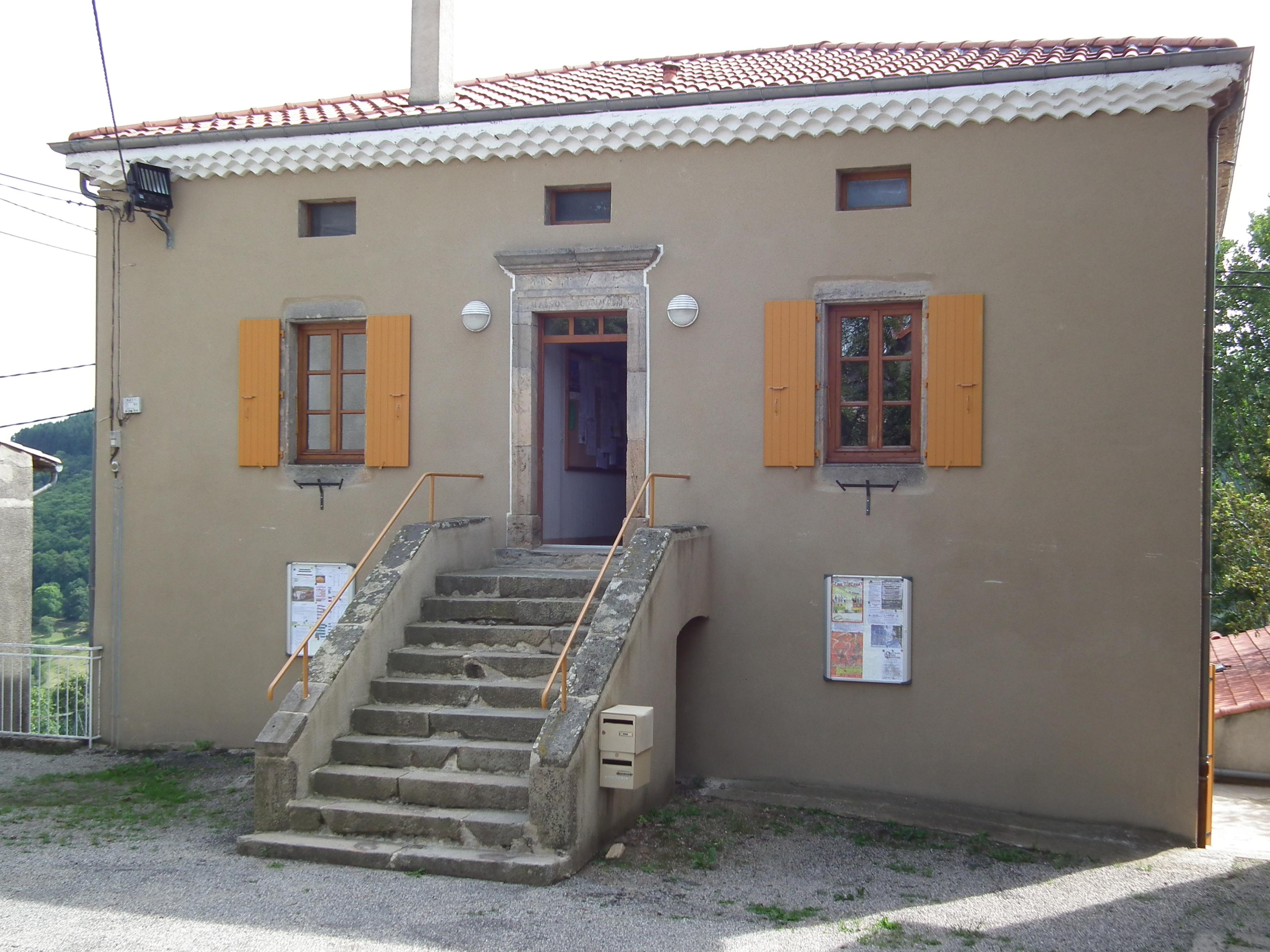
- Town hall
- Location of Saint-Jean-Chambre
- Location within France Location within Auvergne-Rhône-Alpes
- Coordinates: 44°54′16″N 4°33′56″E
- Country: France
- Region: Auvergne-Rhône-Alpes
- Department: Ardèche
- Arrondissement: Privas
- Canton: Rhône-Eyrieux
- Intercommunality: CA Privas Centre Ardèche

Government
  - Mayor (2020–2026): Gilles Durand
- Area^{1}: 15.26 km^{2} (5.89 sq mi)
- Elevation: 750 m (2,460 ft)
- Highest elevation: 907 m (2,976 ft)
- Lowest elevation: 388 m (1,273 ft)
- Population (2023): 255
  - Density: 16.7/km^{2} (43.3/sq mi)
- Time zone: UTC+01:00 (CET)
  - Summer (DST): UTC+02:00 (CEST)
- INSEE/Postal code: 07244 /07240
- ^{1} French Land Register data, which excludes lakes, ponds, glaciers > 1 km^{2} (0.386 sq mi or 247 acres) and river estuaries.

Saint-Jean-Chambre (French pronunciation: [sɛ̃ ʒɑ̃ ʃɑ̃bʁ]; Occitan: Sant Jean Chambre) is a commune in the Ardèche department in southern France.

== Population ==
Historical population
Year	Pop.	±% p.a.
1968	333	—
1975	284	−2.25%
1982	260	−1.25%
1990	235	−1.26%
1999	246	+0.51%
2007	252	+0.30%
2012	266	+1.09%
2017	265	−0.08%
2023	255	−0.64%
Source: INSEE

== See also ==
- Communes of the Ardèche department
