= Guillaume-Mathieu Dumas =

French general (1753–1837)

Count Mathieu Dumas
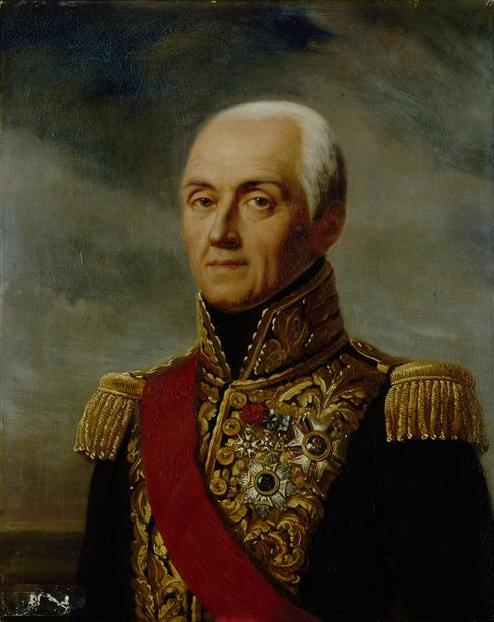
- Portrait by Louise Adélaïde Desnos, 1842
- Born: 23 November 1753; Montpellier, France
- Died: 16 October 1837 (aged 83) Paris, France
- Allegiance: Kingdom of France, Kingdom of France (1791–1792), French First Republic, First French Empire, Bourbon Restoration, July Monarchy
- Service years: 1780–1815
- Rank: General of Division
- Conflicts: American Revolutionary War; French Revolutionary Wars; Napoleonic Wars
- Awards: Name inscribed under the Arc de Triomphe,
- Other work: Peer of France, Member of the council of state, Author of military memoirs

Mathieu, comte Dumas (French pronunciation: [matjø kɔ̃t dymɑ]; 23 November 1753 – 16 October 1837) was a French general and politician.

== Biography ==
Born in Montpellier, France, of a noble family, he joined the French army in 1773 and entered upon active service in 1780, as aide-de-camp to Rochambeau in the American Revolutionary War. He had a share in all the principal engagements that occurred during a period of nearly two years. On the conclusion of peace in 1783 he returned to France as a major.

During 1784 to 1786 Dumas explored the archipelago and the coasts of Turkey. He was present at the siege of Amsterdam in 1787, where he co-operated with the Dutch against the Prussians.

After the outbreak of the French Revolution (1789) he acted with Lafayette and the constitutional liberal party. The National Constituent Assembly entrusted him with the command of the escort which conducted King Louis XVI to Paris after the Flight to Varennes (June 1791). In 1791 as a maréchal de camp he was appointed to a command at Metz, where he rendered important service in improving the discipline of the troops.

Chosen a member of the Legislative Assembly in the same year by the département of Seine-et-Oise, he was in 1792 elected president of the Assembly. When the extreme republicans gained the ascendancy, however, he judged it prudent to make his escape to England. Returning after a brief interval, under the apprehension that his father-in-law would be held responsible for his absence, he arrived in Paris in the midst of the Reign of Terror, and had to flee to Switzerland.

Soon after his return to France he was elected a member of the Council of Ancients in the period of the Directory. After the coup of the 18th Fructidor (4 September 1797) Dumas, being proscribed as a monarchist, made his escape to Holstein, where he wrote the first part of his Précis des événements militaires (published anonymously at Hamburg, 1800).

Recalled to his native country when Bonaparte became First Consul (1799), Dumas took over the organisation of the "Army of Reserve" at Dijon. In 1805 he was nominated a councillor of state. He did good service at the Battle of Austerlitz (2 December 1805), and went in 1806 to Naples, where he became minister of war to Joseph Bonaparte.

On the transfer of Joseph to the throne of Spain (1808), Dumas rejoined the French army, with which he served in Spain during the campaign of 1808, and in Germany during that of 1809. After the Battle of Wagram (5–6 July 1809), Dumas participated in negotiating the armistice with Austria.

In 1810 he became grand officer of the Legion of Honour and a count of the Empire. In the Russian campaign of 1812 he held the post of intendant-general of the army, which involved the charge of the administrative department. The privations he suffered in the retreat from Moscow brought on a dangerous illness. Resuming, on his recovery, his duties as intendant-general, he took part in the battles of 1813, and was made prisoner after the capitulation of Dresden.

On the accession of Louis XVIII (1814), Dumas rendered his new sovereign important services in connection with the administration of the army. When Napoleon returned from Elba in the Hundred Days (1815), Dumas at first kept himself in retirement, but Joseph Bonaparte persuaded him to present himself to the Emperor, who employed him in organising the National Guard.

Obliged to retire after the restoration of Louis XVIII (1815), Dumas devoted his leisure to the continuation of his Précis des événements militaires, of which nineteen volumes, embracing the history of the war from 1798 to the peace of 1807, appeared between 1817 and 1826. A growing weakness of sight, ending in blindness, prevented him from carrying the work further, but he translated Napier's Peninsular War as a sort of continuation to it.

In 1818 Dumas returned to favour and became a member of the council of state, from which, however, he was excluded in 1822. After the July Revolution of 1830, in which he took an active part, Dumas was created a peer of France, and re-entered the council of state. He died in Paris on 16 October 1837.

Besides the Précis des événements militaires, which forms a valuable source for the history of the period, Dumas wrote Souvenirs du lieutenant-général Comte Mathieu Dumas (published posthumously by his son, Paris, 1839).
