= Constitution of the Year III =

Supreme law of the French Republic during the Directory period

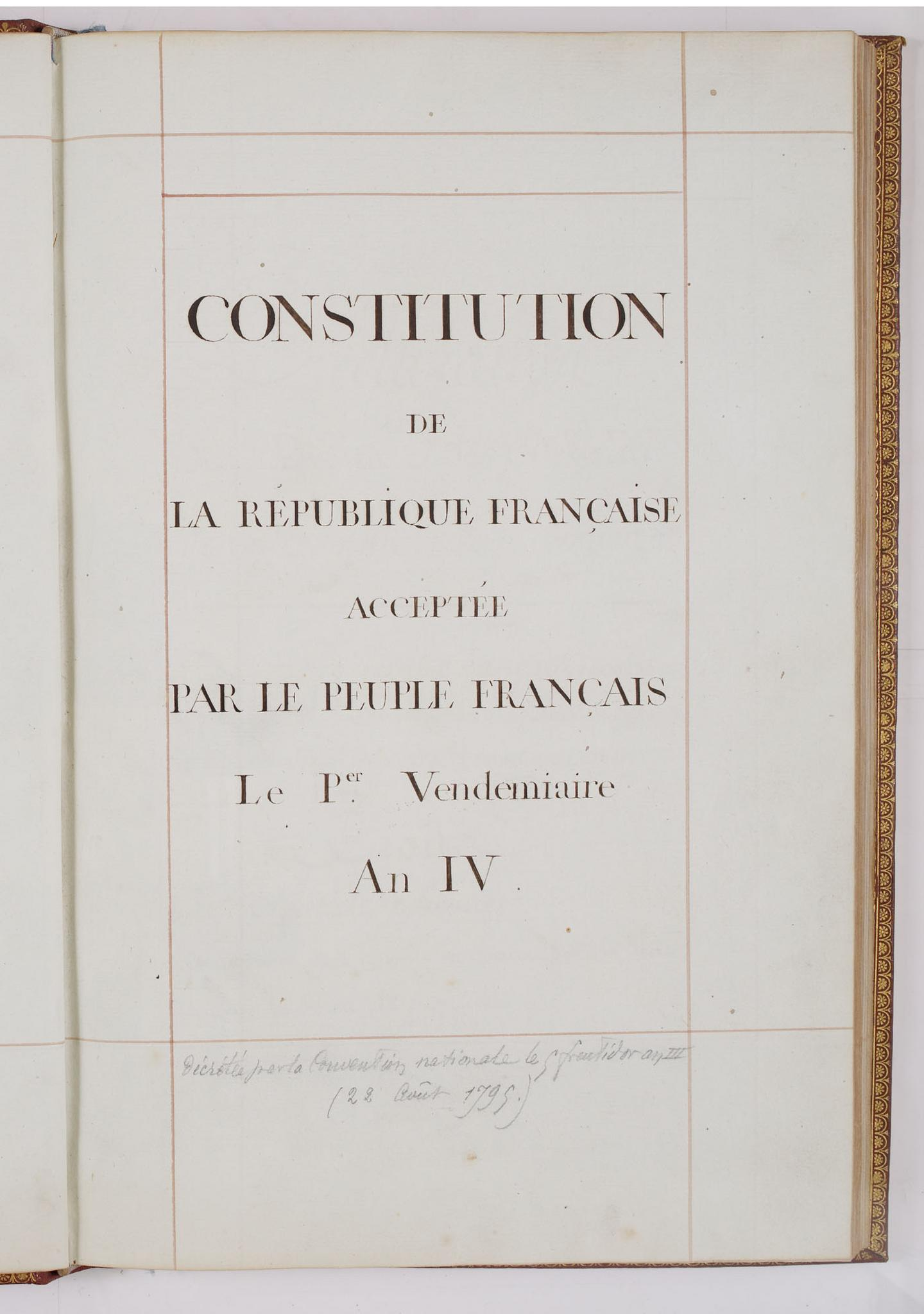
- Title page of the original edition
- Original title: Constitution de l'an III
- Presented: 22 August 1795
- Date effective: 22 September 1795
- System: Unitary directorial republic
- Chambers: Bicameral (Council of Ancients and Council of Five Hundred)
- Executive: Directory
- Repealed: 1799
- Location: Archives Nationales
- Supersedes: French Constitution of 1793
- Superseded by: Constitution of the Year VIII

Full text
- Constitution of the Year III at Wikisource
- Constitution de l'an III at French Wikisource

The Constitution of the Year III (French: Constitution de l’an III) was the constitution of the French First Republic that established the Directory. It was adopted by the convention on 5 Fructidor Year III (22 August 1795) and approved by plebiscite on 6 September. Its preamble is the Declaration of the Rights and Duties of Man and of the Citizen of 1789.

It remained in effect until the coup of 18 Brumaire (9 November 1799) effectively ended the Revolutionary period and began the rise to power of Napoleon Bonaparte. It was more conservative than the not implemented, radically democratic French Constitution of 1793.

Largely the work of political theorist Pierre Daunou, it established a bicameral legislature; an upper body known as the Council of Ancients, and a lower house, or Council of 500. This was intended to slow down the legislative process, in reaction to the wild swings of policy resulting from the unicameral National Assembly, Legislative Assembly, and National Convention.

All taxpaying French males over 25 were eligible to vote in primary elections, subject to a one year residence provision; it is estimated these totalled around 5 million, more than the 4 million under the 1791 Constitution. They selected 30,000 electors, over the age of 30 and income equivalent to 150 days taxes, who in turn voted for the Council of 500.

A five-man Directory, chosen by lot each year, constituted the executive branch. The central government retained great power, including emergency powers to curb freedom of the press and freedom of association. The Declaration of Rights and Duties of Mankind at the beginning of the constitution included an explicit ban on slavery. It was succeeded by the Constitution of the Year VIII, which established the Consulate.

== Background ==
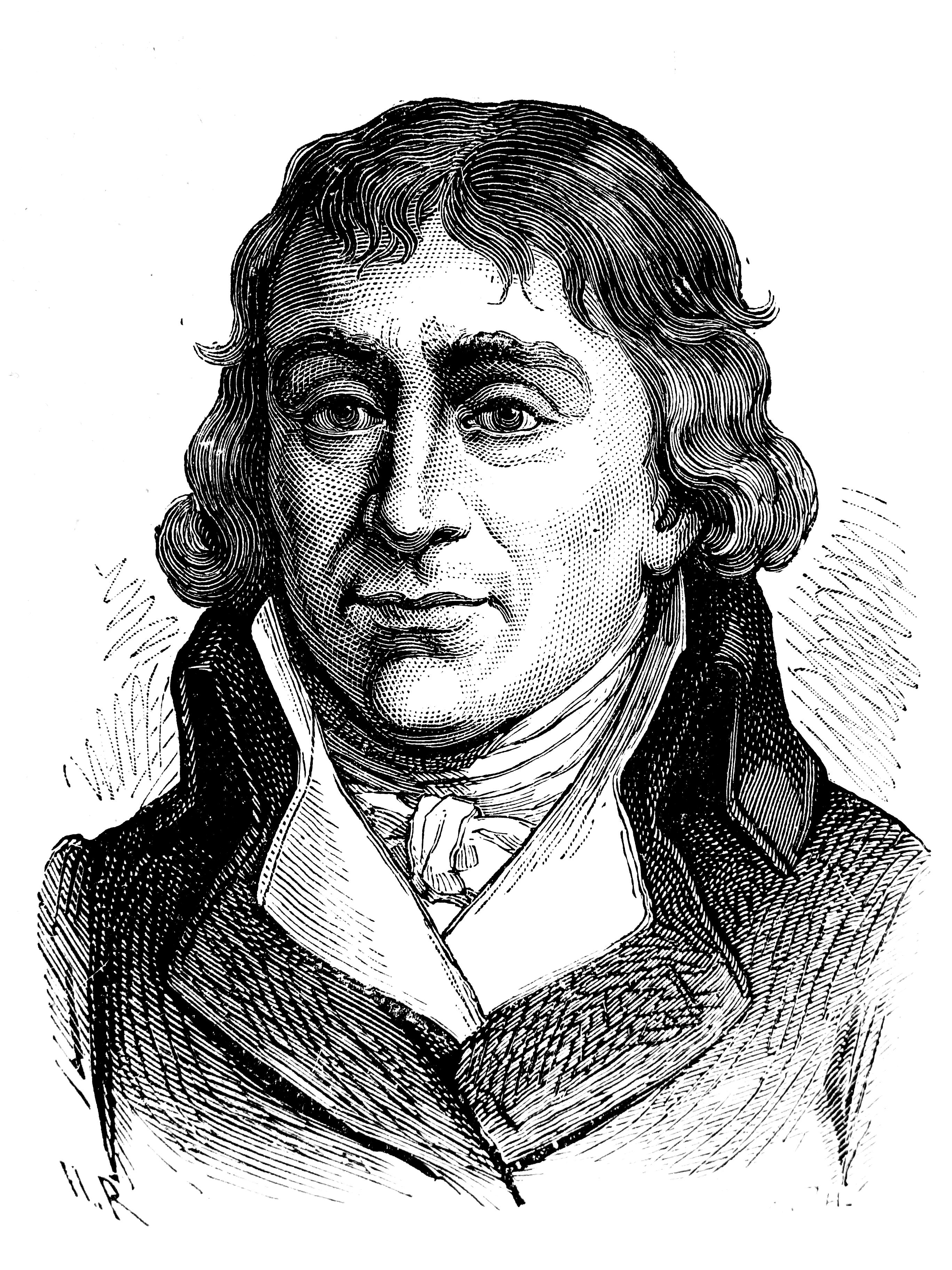
Pierre Claude François Daunou was the principal author of the Constitution of Year III.

After the fall of Robespierre and the overthrowing of the Revolutionary Government on 9 Thermidor Year II (27 July 1794), the Thermidorian Convention refused to apply the Constitution of June 1793, also known as the Constitution of the First Year. The Thermidorians decided instead to draft the Constitution of Year III, intended to be more liberal, moderate, and favourable to the bourgeoisie than that of the First Year.

On 4 Floréal Year III (23 April 1795), the Convention delegates the task of drafting a new Constitution to a commission composed of 11 of its members, including Boissy d'Anglas, future Second Consul Cambacérès, Daunou, Merlin de Douai, and the Abbé Sieyès. A decree (décret) of 15 Floréal had declared the position of a member of the Constitutional Commission incompatible with being a member of the Committee of Public Safety. Following this decree, Cambacérès, Merlin, and Sieyès opted to remain members of the Committee, and were replaced by Baudin, Durand-Maillane, and Lanjuinais.

While discussing the project, Sieyès wished to implement a control of the constitutionality of laws, by creating a "Constitutional Jury" (French: Jury Constitutionnaire"). Despite defending this idea in June 1795, it was not implemented, but would later become the basis of the Conservative Senate (Sénat conservateur) of the Consulate.

The day after the close of debates, the first day of Fructidor An III, deputy Baudin des Ardennes presented a report on "the means of ending the Revolution", in which he recommended that two-thirds of the seats on the Conseil des Anciens and the Conseil des Cinq-Cents be reserved for members of the former Convention, amount to 500 of the 750 elected. To justify this "decree of two-thirds" (French: Décret des deux-tiers), he explained that "the fall of the Constituent Assembly taught you well enough that (electing) an entirely new legislature to set in motion a constitution that has not yet been tried is an infallible means of having it overthrown".

The decree was passed, along with the constitution, on 5 fructidor an III (August 22, 1795). The decree and constitution were then each submitted to a plebiscite and approved on a low turnout, and adopted by the decree of 1st Vendémiaire, An IV (September 23, 1795), proclaiming the French people's acceptance of the constitution presented to them by the National Convention.

The royalists responded to the two-thirds decree with the insurrection of 13 Vendémiaire (October 5, 1795). The Thermidorians thus retained the Republic, but re-established two-tier census suffrage out of distrust of universal suffrage.

== Territorial modifications ==
The new territory of the French Republic is detailed in the first of the three Titles (Titres) of the Constitution of the Year III, "Division of the Territory" (French: Division du territoire).

The territory of the Republic is composed of 89 departments, composed of 81 of the 83 departments created in 1790, to which were added the following 8 departments:

- Golo and Liamone, resulting from the partition of Corsica;
- Loire and Rhône, resulting from the partition of Rhône-et-Loire;
- Alpes-Maritimes, resulting from the annexation of the county of Nice;
- Mont-Blanc, resulting from the annexation of the Duchy of Savoy
- Mont-Terrible, resulting from the annexation of the principality of Montbéliard and part of the bishopric of Basel;
- Vaucluse, resulting from the annexation of Avignon and Comtat Venaissin

Colonies are declared “integral parts of the Republic” and “subject to the same constitutional law”, and therefore given the statute of departments. Their departmentalisation is achieved by the creation of 11 to 13 departments:

- four to six departments in Santo Domingo;
- Guadeloupe and its dependencies (Marie-Galante, La Désirade, the Saintes and the French part of Saint-Martin);
- Martinique;
- French Guiana and Cayenne;
- Saint-Lucia and Tobago;
- Île-de-France, Seychelles, Rodrigues and the establishments of Madagascar;
- Reunion Island;
- The East-Indies, Pondichery, Chandernagor, Mahé, Karical, and other establishments

== Citizenship ==
=== Acquiring of French citizenship ===
==== Text of the law ====
French	English
Article 8. - Tout homme né et résidant en France, qui, âgé de vingt et un ans accomplis, s'est fait inscrire sur le registre civique de son canton, qui a demeuré depuis pendant une année sur le territoire de la République, et qui paie une contribution directe, foncière ou personnelle, est citoyen français.	Article 8. - Any man born and residing in France, who, having reached the age of twenty-one, has registered in the civic register of his canton, who has resided for one year in the territory of the Republic, and who pays a direct tax, land or personal, is a French citizen.
Article 9. - Sont citoyens, sans aucune condition de contribution, les Français qui auront fait une ou plusieurs campagnes pour l'établissement de la République.	Article 9. - Frenchmen who have carried out one or more campaigns for the establishment of the Republic are citizens, without any condition of contribution.
Article 10. - L'étranger devient citoyen français, lorsque après avoir atteint l'âge de vingt et un ans accomplis, et avoir déclaré l'intention de se fixer en France, il y a résidé pendant sept années consécutives, pourvu qu'il y paie une contribution directe, et qu'en outre il y possède une propriété foncière, ou un établissement d'agriculture ou de commerce, ou qu'il y ait épousé une femme française.	Article 10. - A foreigner becomes a French citizen when, after having reached the age of twenty-one years, and having declared the intention of settling in France, he has resided there for seven consecutive years, provided that he pays a direct contribution there, and that in addition he owns landed property there, or an agricultural or commercial establishment, or that he has married a French woman there.
Article 11. - Les citoyens français peuvent seuls voter dans les Assemblées primaires, et être appelés aux fonctions établies par la Constitution.	Article 11. - Only French citizens may vote in the Primary Assemblies and be called upon to perform the functions established by the Constitution.
Article 12. - L'exercice des Droits de citoyen se perd : 1. Par la naturalisation en pays étrangers; 2. Par l'affiliation à toute corporation étrangère qui supposerait des distinctions de naissance, ou qui exigerait des vœux de religion; 3. Par l'acceptation de fonctions ou de pensions offertes par un gouvernement étranger; 4. Par la condamnation à des peines afflictives ou infamantes, jusqu'à réhabilitation.	Article 12. - The exercise of citizenship rights is lost: 1. By naturalization in a foreign country; 2. By affiliation with any foreign corporation that would imply distinctions of birth, or that would require religious vows; 3. By accepting positions or pensions offered by a foreign government; 4. By being sentenced to afflictive or infamous penalties, until rehabilitation.
Article 13. - L'exercice des Droits de citoyen est suspendu : 1. Par l'interdiction judiciaire pour cause de fureur, de démence ou d'imbécillité; 2. Par l'état de débiteur failli, ou d'héritier immédiat; détenteur à titre gratuit, de tout ou partie de la succession d'un failli; 3. Par l'état de domestique à gage, attaché au service de la personne ou du ménage; 4. Par l'état d'accusation; 5. Par un jugement de contumace, tant que le jugement n'est pas anéanti.	Article 13. - The exercise of citizenship rights is suspended: 1. By judicial interdict due to rage, insanity, or imbecility; 2. By the status of bankrupt debtor, or immediate heir; holder, free of charge, of all or part of a bankrupt's estate; 3. By the status of hired servant, attached to the service of the person or household; 4. By being [criminally] charged; 5. By a judgment of contumaciousness, as long as the judgment is not annulled.

== Sources ==
- Lyons, Martyn (1975). France under the Directory (2008 ed.). Cambridge University Press. ISBN 978-0521099509.
- Machelon, Jean-Pierr; Conac, Gérard (1999). La Constitution de l'an III, Boissy d'Anglas et la naissance du libéralisme constitutionnel [The Constitution of Year III: Boissy d’Anglas and the birth of constitutional liberalism] (in French). Presses Universitaires de France. ISBN 978-2-13-063729-5.
