= Napoleon =

Emperor of the French (1804–1814; 1815)

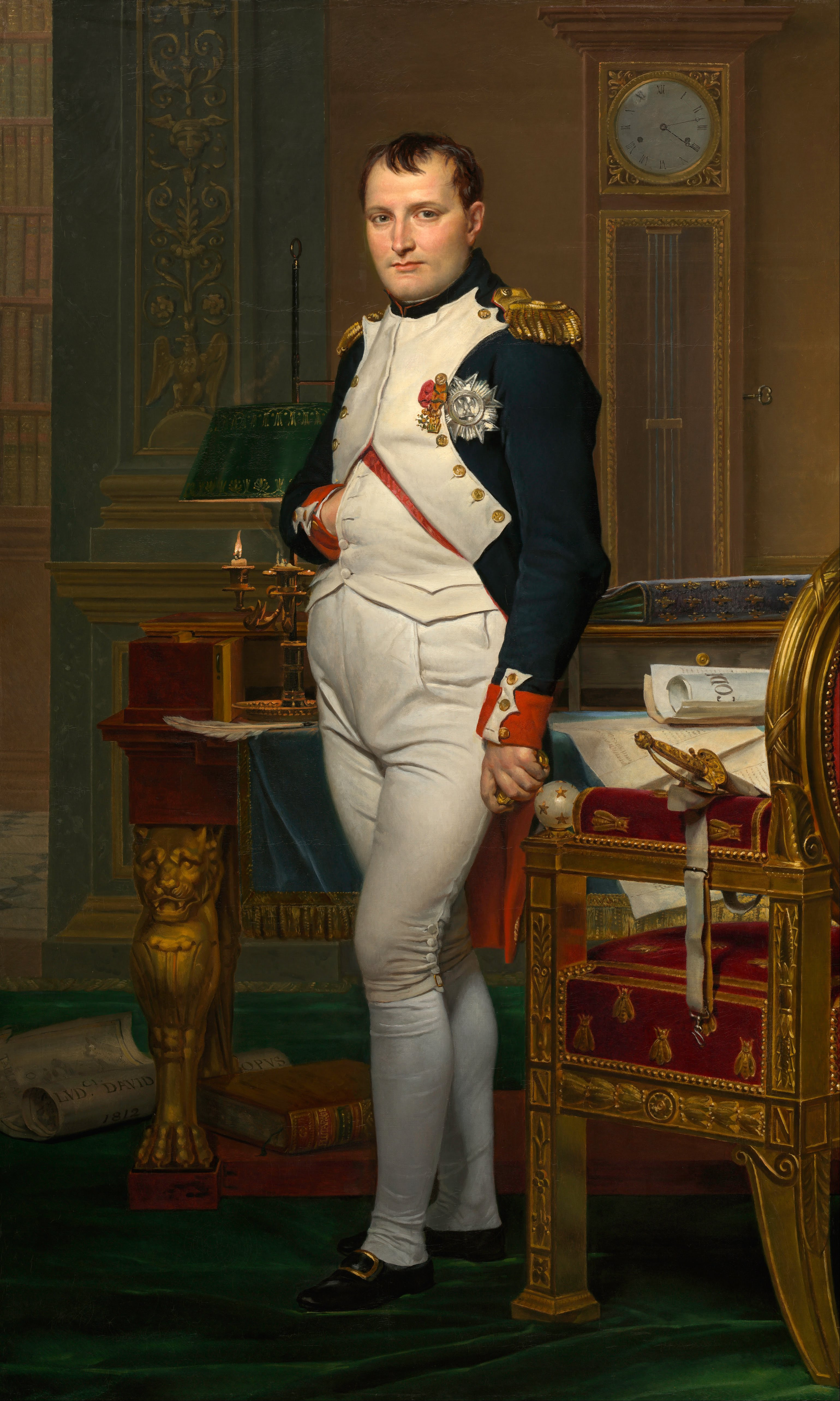
- The Emperor Napoleon in His Study at the Tuileries, 1812

Emperor of the French
- 1st reign: 18 May 1804 – 6 April 1814
- Successor: Louis XVIII (Note: As King of France)
- 2nd reign: 20 March 1815 – 22 June 1815
- Successor: Louis XVIII

First Consul of the French Republic
- In office 13 December 1799 – 18 May 1804

Provisional Consul of the French Republic
- In office 10 November 1799 – 12 December 1799
Other offices held
Protector of the Confederation of the Rhine
In office
12 July 1806 – 19 October 1813
King of Italy
In office
17 March 1805 – 11 April 1814
Mediator of the Swiss Confederation
In office
19 February 1803 – 19 October 1813
President of the Italian Republic
In office
26 January 1802 – 17 March 1805
Sovereign Prince of Elba
In office
11 April 1814 – 26 February 1815
- Born: Napoleone di Buonaparte; 15 August 1769; Ajaccio, Corsica, France
- Died: 5 May 1821 (aged 51); Longwood, Saint Helena
- Burial: 15 December 1840; Les Invalides, Paris, France
- Spouses: Joséphine de Beauharnais (m. 1796; ann. 1810) Marie Louise of Austria (m. 1810; sep. 1814)

Napoleon Bonaparte (Note: Pronounced /nə.ˈpoʊ.li.ən ˈboʊ.nə.pɑːrt/; French: Napoléon Bonaparte, pronounced [napɔleɔ̃ bɔnapaʁt]) (born Napoleone di Buonaparte; (Note: Italian: [napoleˈoːne di ˌbwɔnaˈparte]; Corsican: Napulione Buonaparte [napuliˈɔnɛ di ˌb(w)ɔnaˈbartɛ].) 15 August 1769 – 5 May 1821) was Emperor of the French from 18 May 1804 until his first abdication in 1814, with a brief restoration during the Hundred Days in 1815. He rose to prominence as a general during the French Revolution and led a series of military campaigns across Europe and the Middle East during the French Revolutionary and Napoleonic Wars. As a statesman, he implemented numerous legal and administrative reforms in France and Europe.

Born on the island of Corsica to a family of Italian origin, Napoleon moved to mainland France in 1779 and was commissioned as an officer in the French Royal Army in 1785. He supported the French Revolution in 1789 and promoted its cause in Corsica. He rose rapidly through the ranks after winning the siege of Toulon in 1793 and defeating royalist insurgents in Paris on 13 Vendémiaire in 1795. In 1796 he commanded a military campaign against the Austrians and their Italian allies in the War of the First Coalition, scoring decisive victories and becoming a national hero. He led an invasion of Egypt and Syria in 1798, which served as a springboard for his rise to political power. In November 1799 Napoleon engineered the Coup of 18 Brumaire against the French Directory and became First Consul of the Republic. He won the Battle of Marengo in 1800, which secured France's victory in the War of the Second Coalition, and in 1803 he sold the territory of Louisiana to the United States. In December 1804 Napoleon crowned himself Emperor of the French, further consolidating his power.

The breakdown of the Treaty of Amiens led to the War of the Third Coalition by 1805. Napoleon shattered the coalition with a decisive victory at the Battle of Austerlitz, which led to the dissolution of the Holy Roman Empire. In the War of the Fourth Coalition, Napoleon defeated Prussia at the Battle of Jena–Auerstedt in 1806, marched his Grande Armée into Eastern Europe, and defeated the Russians in 1807 at the Battle of Friedland. Seeking to extend his trade embargo against Britain, Napoleon invaded the Iberian Peninsula and installed his brother Joseph as King of Spain in 1808, provoking the Peninsular War. In 1809 the Austrians again challenged France in the War of the Fifth Coalition, during which Napoleon consolidated his dominance over Europe after winning the Battle of Wagram. In the summer of 1812 he launched an invasion of Russia. After forcing the Russians to abandon Moscow following the Battle of Borodino, Napoleon briefly occupied the city before conducting a catastrophic retreat of his army that winter. In 1813 Prussia and Austria joined Russia in the War of the Sixth Coalition, in which Napoleon was decisively defeated at the Battle of Leipzig. The coalition invaded France and captured Paris, forcing Napoleon to abdicate in April 1814. He was exiled to the Mediterranean island of Elba and the Bourbons were restored to power. Ten months later Napoleon escaped from Elba with around a thousand men and marched on Paris, reclaiming control of the country. His opponents responded by forming a Seventh Coalition, which defeated him at the Battle of Waterloo in June 1815. Napoleon was exiled to the remote island of Saint Helena in the South Atlantic, where he died of stomach cancer in 1821, aged 51.

Since his death, Napoleon has maintained a prominent place in historical research and popular culture. He is considered one of the greatest military commanders in history, and Napoleonic tactics are still studied at military schools worldwide. His legacy endures through the legal and administrative reforms he enacted in France and Western Europe, most notably the Napoleonic Code. He established a system of public education, abolished the vestiges of feudalism, emancipated Jews and other religious minorities, abolished the Spanish Inquisition, enacted the principle of equality before the law for an emerging middle class, and centralized state power at the expense of religious authorities. His conquests also acted as a catalyst for political change and the development of nation-states. However, he remains controversial because of his role in wars that devastated Europe, his looting of conquered territories, and his mixed record on civil rights. He abolished the free press, ended directly elected representative government, exiled and imprisoned critics of his regime, reinstated slavery in French colonies, banned the entry of black people and mulattos into France, reduced the civil rights of women and children, reintroduced a hereditary monarchy and nobility, and violently repressed popular uprisings against his rule.

== Early life ==
Napoleon's family was of Italian origin. His paternal ancestors, the Buonapartes, descended from a minor Tuscan noble family who emigrated to Corsica in the 16th century. His maternal ancestors, the Ramolinos, descended from a noble family from Lombardy. Napoleon's parents, Carlo Maria Buonaparte and Maria Letizia Ramolino, lived in the Maison Bonaparte in Ajaccio, where Napoleon was born on 15 August 1769. He had an elder brother, Joseph, and six younger siblings: Lucien, Elisa, Louis, Pauline, Caroline, and Jérôme. Five more siblings were stillborn or did not survive infancy. Napoleon was baptized as a Catholic under the name Napoleone di Buonaparte. In his youth, his name was also spelled as Nabulione, Nabulio, Napolionne, and Napulione.

Napoleon was born one year after the Republic of Genoa ceded Corsica to France through the Treaty of Versailles. (Note: Although the 1768 Treaty of Versailles formally ceded Corsica's rights, it remained un-incorporated during 1769 until it became one of the Provinces of France in 1770. Corsica would be legally integrated as a département in 1789.) His father supported Pasquale Paoli during the Corsican war of independence against France. After the Corsican defeat at the Battle of Ponte Novu in 1769 and Paoli's exile to Britain, Carlo became friends with the French governor Charles Louis de Marbeuf, who became his patron and a godfather to Napoleon. With Marbeuf's support, Carlo was named Corsican representative to the court of Louis XVI, and Napoleon obtained a royal bursary to a military academy in mainland France.

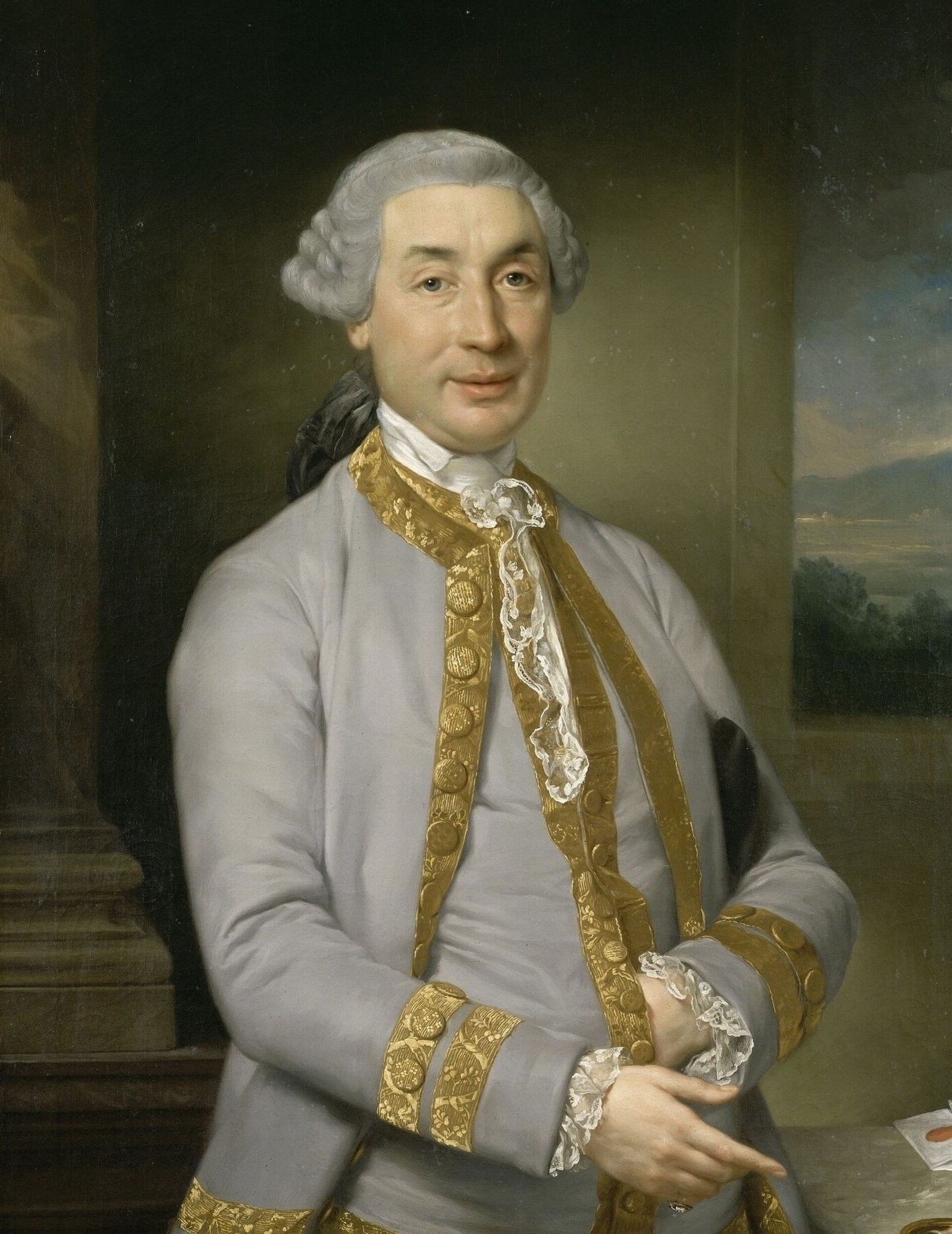
Napoleon's father, Carlo Buonaparte, fought for Corsican independence under Pasquale Paoli. After their defeat, he eventually became the island's representative to Louis XVI's court.

The dominant influence of Napoleon's childhood was his mother, whose firm discipline restrained a rambunctious child. Later in life, Napoleon said, "The future destiny of the child is always the work of the mother." Napoleon's noble, moderately affluent background afforded him greater opportunities to study than were available to a typical Corsican of the time.

In January 1779, aged 9, Napoleon moved to the French mainland and enrolled at a religious school in Autun to improve his French, his mother tongues being Corsican and Italian. Although he eventually became fluent in French, he spoke it with a Corsican accent, and his French spelling was poor. In May he transferred to the military academy at Brienne-le-Château where he was routinely bullied by his peers for his accent, birthplace, short stature, mannerisms, and poor French. He became reserved and melancholic, applying himself to reading. An examiner observed that Napoleon "has always been distinguished for his application in mathematics. He is fairly well acquainted with history and geography ... This boy would make an excellent sailor". (Note: Aside from his name, there does not appear to be a connection between him and Napoleon's theorem.)

One story of Napoleon at the school is that he led junior students to victory against senior students in a snowball fight, which allegedly showed his leadership abilities. But the story was told only after Napoleon had become famous. In his later years at Brienne, Napoleon became an outspoken Corsican nationalist and admirer of Paoli.

In September 1784 Napoleon was admitted to the École militaire in Paris where he trained to become an artillery officer. He excelled at mathematics and read widely in geography, history and literature. However, he was poor at French and German. His father's death in February 1785 cut the family income and forced him to complete the two-year course in one year. In September he was examined by the famed scientist Pierre-Simon Laplace and became the first Corsican to graduate from the École militaire.

== Early career ==
Battles of Napoleon
Rescale the fullscreen map to see Saint Helena

=== Return to Corsica ===
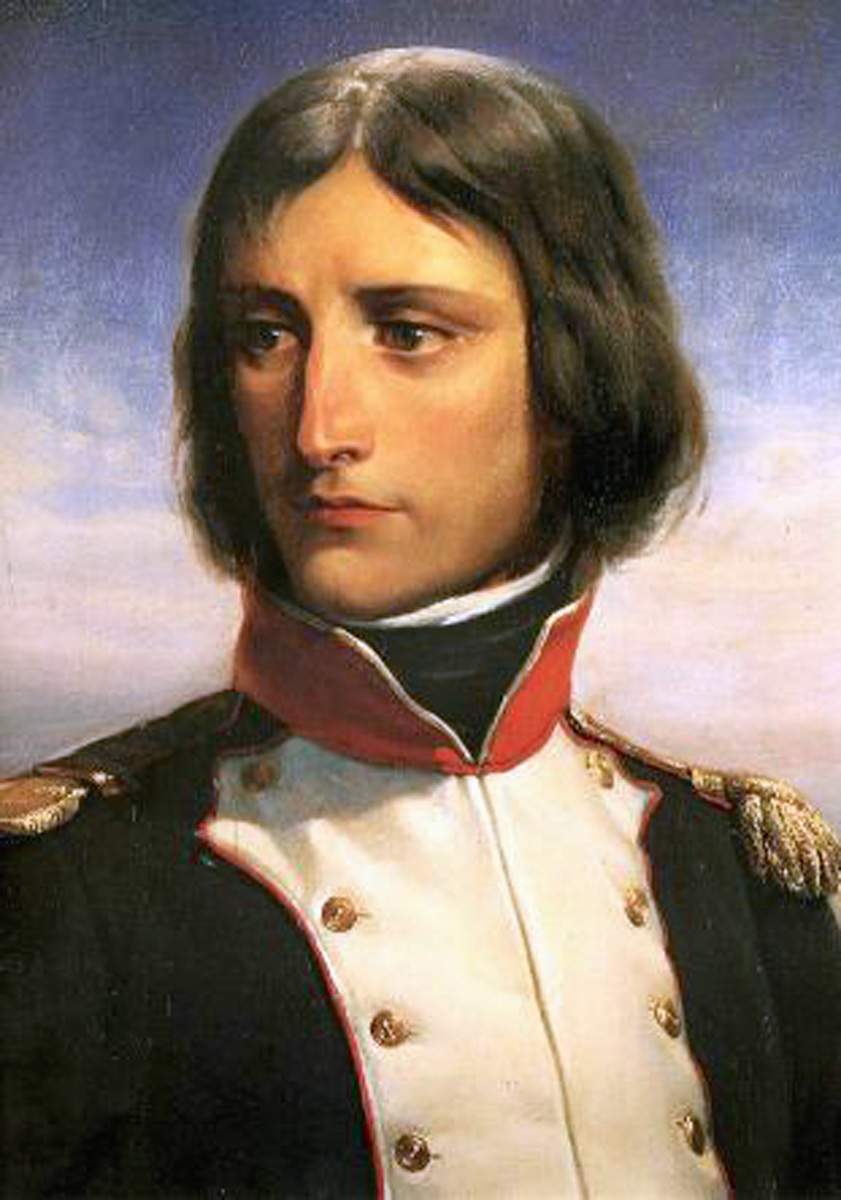
Bonaparte, aged 23, as lieutenant-colonel of a battalion of Corsican Republican volunteers. Portrait made in 1835 by Henri Félix Emmanuel Philippoteaux.

Upon graduating in September 1785, Bonaparte was commissioned a second lieutenant in La Fère artillery regiment. Bonaparte served in Valence and Auxonne until after the outbreak of the French Revolution in 1789 but spent long periods of leave in Corsica, which fed his Corsican nationalism. In September 1789 he returned to Corsica and promoted the French revolutionary cause. Paoli returned to the island in July 1790, but he had no sympathy for Bonaparte, as he deemed his father a traitor for having deserted the cause of Corsican independence.

Bonaparte plunged into a complex three-way struggle among royalists, revolutionaries, and Corsican nationalists. He became a supporter of the Jacobins and joined the pro-French Corsican Republicans who opposed Paoli's policy and his aspirations to secede. He was given command over a battalion of Corsican volunteers and promoted to captain in the regular army in 1792, despite exceeding his leave of absence and a dispute between his volunteers and the French garrison in Ajaccio.

In February 1793 Bonaparte took part in the failed French expedition to Sardinia. Following allegations that Paoli had sabotaged the expedition and that his regime was corrupt and incompetent, the French National Convention outlawed him. In early June, Bonaparte and 400 French troops failed to capture Ajaccio from Corsican volunteers, and the island came under the control of Paoli's supporters. When Bonaparte learned that the Corsican assembly had condemned him and his family, the Buonapartes fled to Toulon on the French mainland.

=== Siege of Toulon ===
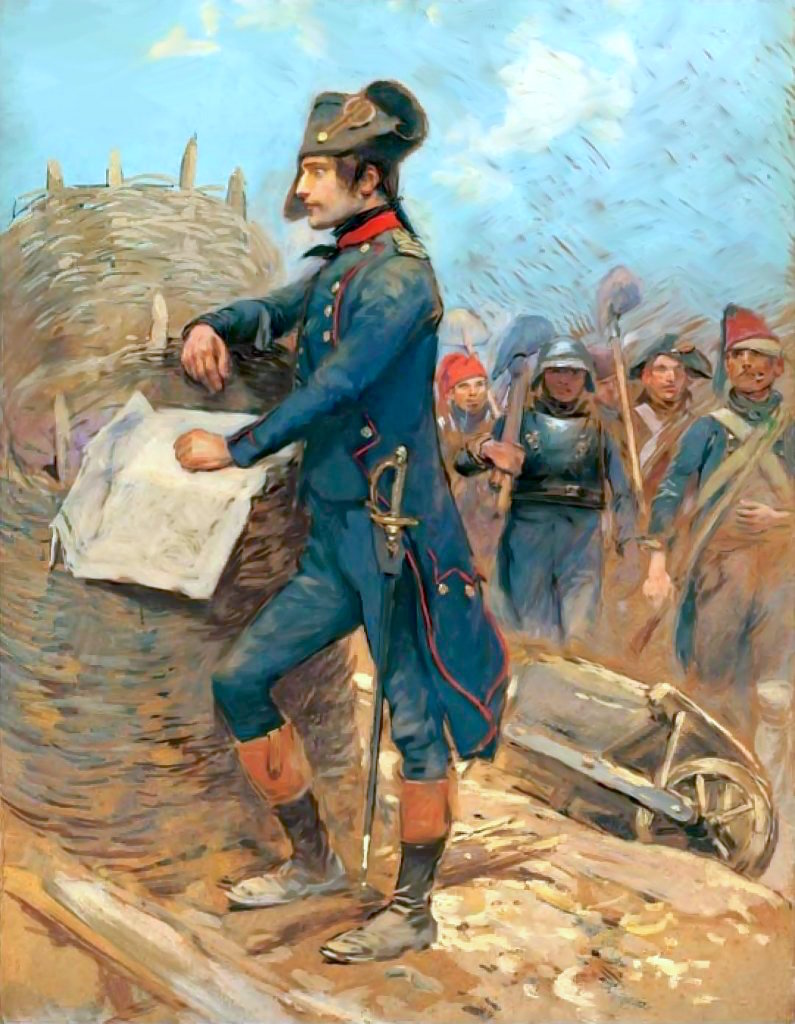
Bonaparte at the Siege of Toulon, 1793, by Édouard Detaille

Bonaparte returned to his regiment in Nice and was made captain of a coastal battery. In July 1793 he published a pamphlet, Le souper de Beaucaire (Supper at Beaucaire), demonstrating his support for the National Convention which was heavily influenced by the Jacobins.

In September, with the help of his fellow Corsican Antoine Christophe Saliceti, Bonaparte was appointed artillery commander of the republican forces sent to recapture the port of Toulon, which was occupied by allied forces. He quickly increased the available artillery and proposed a plan to capture a hill fort where republican guns could dominate the city's harbour and force the allies to evacuate. The successful assault on the position on 16–17 December led to the capture of the city.

Toulon brought Bonaparte to the attention of powerful men including Augustin Robespierre, the younger brother of Maximilien Robespierre, a leading Jacobin. He was promoted to brigadier general and put in charge of defences on the Mediterranean coast. In February 1794 he was made artillery commander of the Army of Italy and devised plans to attack the Kingdom of Sardinia.

The French army carried out Bonaparte's plan in the Second Battle of Saorgio in April 1794 and then advanced to seize Ormea in the mountains. From Ormea it headed west to outflank the Austro-Sardinian positions around Saorge. After this campaign, Augustin Robespierre sent Bonaparte on a mission to the Republic of Genoa to determine the country's intentions towards France.

=== 13 Vendémiaire ===
Journée du 13 Vendémiaire, artillery fire in front of the Church of Saint-Roch, Paris, Rue Saint-Honoré

After the Fall of Maximilien Robespierre in July 1794, Bonaparte's association with leading Jacobins made him politically suspect to the new regime. He was arrested on 9 August but released two weeks later. He was asked to draw up plans to attack Italian positions as part of France's war with Austria, and in March 1795 he took part in an expedition to take back Corsica from the British, but the French were repulsed by the Royal Navy.

From 1794 Bonaparte was in a romantic relationship with Désirée Clary, whose sister Julie Clary had married Bonaparte's elder brother Joseph. In April 1795 Bonaparte was assigned to the Army of the West, which was engaged in the War in the Vendée—a civil war and royalist counter-revolution in the Vendée region. As an infantry command, it was a demotion from artillery general, and he pleaded poor health to avoid the posting. During this period he wrote the romantic novella Clisson et Eugénie, about a soldier and his lover, in a clear parallel to Bonaparte's own relationship with Clary.

In August he obtained a position with the Bureau of Topography, where he worked on military planning. On 15 September he was removed from the list of generals in regular service for refusing to serve in the Vendée campaign. He sought a transfer to Constantinople to offer his services to Sultan Selim III. The request was eventually granted, but he never took up the post.

On 3 October royalists in Paris declared a rebellion against the National Convention. Paul Barras, a leader of the Thermidorian Reaction, knew of Bonaparte's military exploits at Toulon and made him second in command of the forces defending the convention in the Tuileries Palace. Bonaparte had seen the massacre of the king's Swiss Guard during the Insurrection of 10 August 1792 three years earlier and realized that artillery would be the key to its defence. He ordered a young cavalry officer, Joachim Murat, to seize cannons, and Bonaparte deployed them in key positions. On 5 October 1795—13 Vendémiaire An IV in the French Republican calendar—he fired on the rebels with canister rounds (described by Thomas Carlyle as "the whiff of grapeshot"). About 300 to 1,400 rebels died in the uprising. Bonaparte's role in defeating the rebellion earned him and his family the patronage of the new government, the French Directory. On 26 October he was promoted to commander of the Army of the Interior, and in January 1796, he was appointed head of the Army of Italy.

Within weeks of the Vendémiaire uprising, Bonaparte was romantically involved with Joséphine de Beauharnais, the former mistress of Barras. Josephine had been born in the French colonies in the Lesser Antilles, and her family owned slaves on sugar plantations. The couple married on 9 March 1796 in a civil ceremony. Bonaparte began to habitually style himself "Napoleon Bonaparte" rather than using the Italian form "Napoleone di Buonaparte."

=== First Italian campaign ===
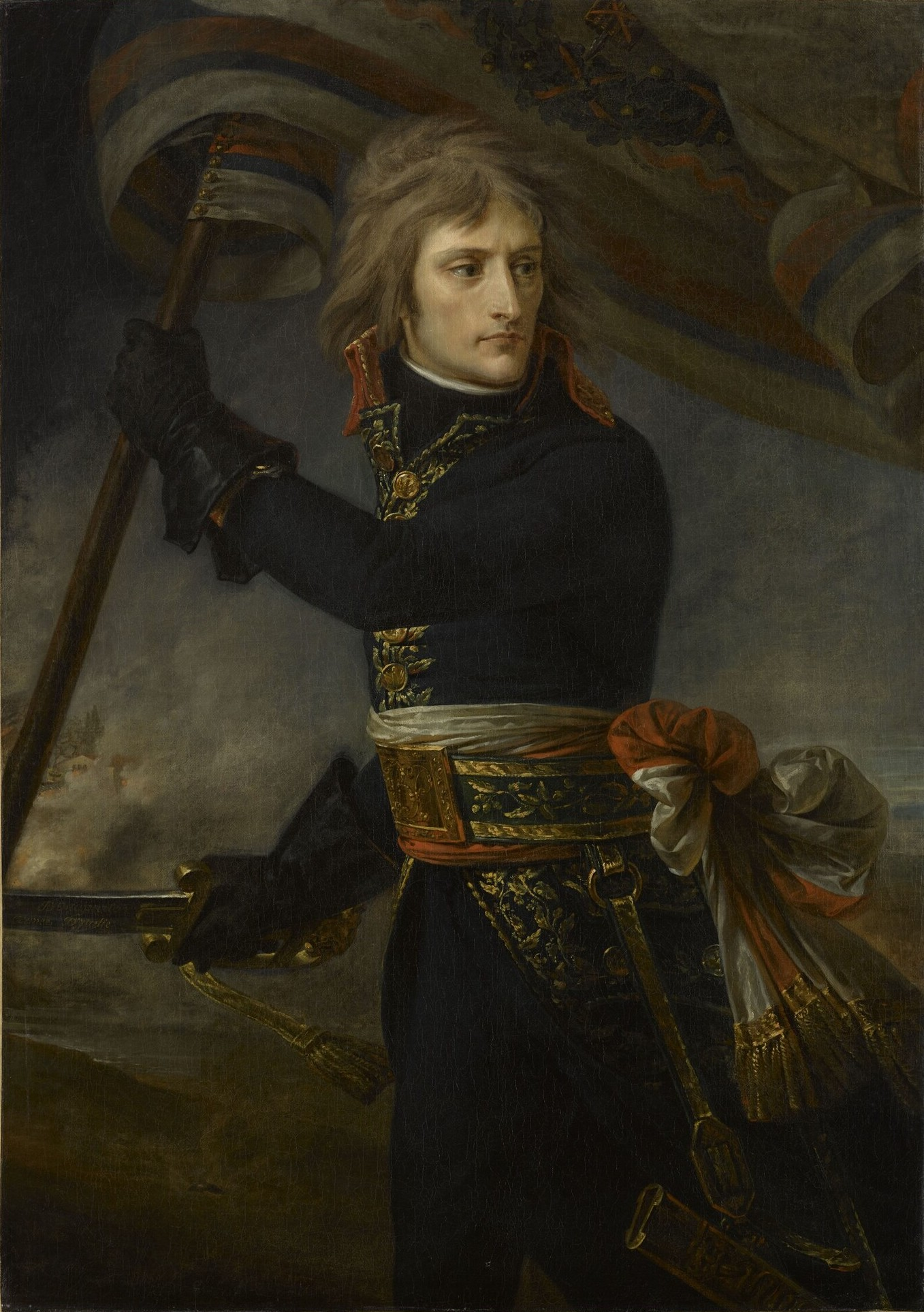
Bonaparte at the Pont d'Arcole, by Baron Antoine-Jean Gros, (c. 1801), Musée du Louvre, Paris

Two days after the marriage, Bonaparte left Paris to take command of the Army of Italy. He went on the offensive, hoping to defeat the Kingdom of Sardinia in Piedmont before their Austrian allies could intervene. In a series of victories during the Montenotte campaign, he knocked the Piedmontese out of the war in two weeks. The French then focused on the Austrians, laying siege to Mantua. The Austrians launched offensives against the French to break the siege, but Bonaparte defeated every relief effort, winning the Battle of Castiglione, the Battle of Bassano, the Battle of Arcole, and the Battle of Rivoli. The French triumph at Rivoli in January 1797 led to the collapse of the Austrian position in Italy. At Rivoli Austria lost 43% of its soldiers dead, wounded or taken prisoner.

The French then invaded the heartlands of the House of Habsburg. French forces in southern Germany had been defeated by Archduke Charles, Duke of Teschen in 1796, but Charles withdrew his forces to protect Vienna after learning of Bonaparte's assault. In their first encounter, Bonaparte pushed Charles back and advanced deep into Austrian territory after winning the Battle of Tarvis in March 1797. Alarmed by the French thrust that reached Leoben, about 100 km from Vienna, the Austrians sued for peace. The preliminary peace of Leoben, signed on 18 April, gave France control of most of northern Italy and the Low Countries and promised to partition the Republic of Venice with Austria. Bonaparte marched on Venice and forced its surrender, ending 1,100 years of Venetian independence. He authorized the French to loot treasures such as the Horses of Saint Mark.

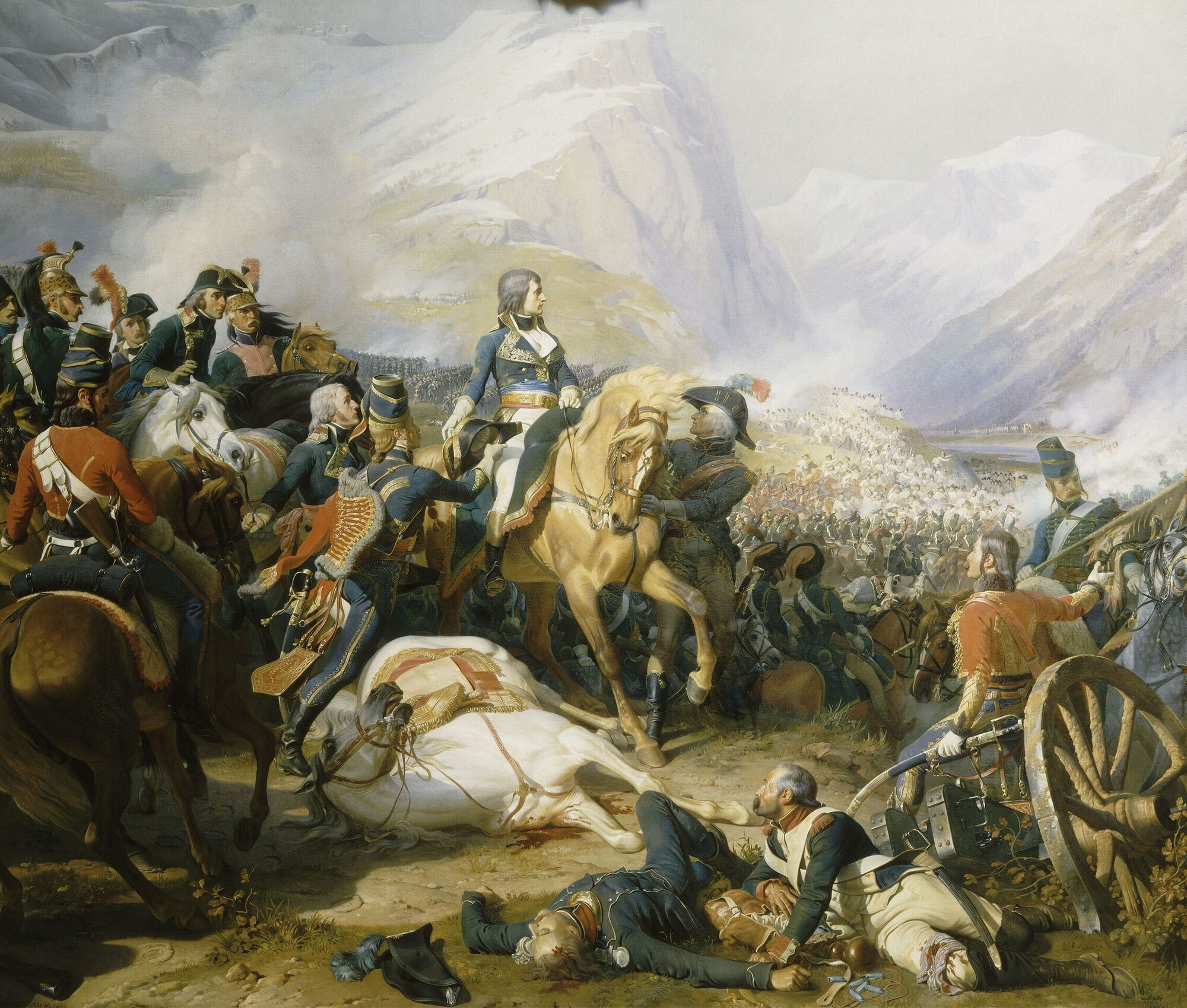
Napoleon at the Battle of Rivoli by Henri Félix Emmanuel Philippoteaux, 1844

In this Italian campaign, Bonaparte's army captured 150,000 prisoners, 540 cannons, and 170 standards. The French army fought 67 actions and won 18 pitched battles through superior artillery technology and Bonaparte's tactics. Bonaparte extracted an estimated 45 million French pounds from Italy during the campaign, another 12 million pounds in precious metals and jewels, and more than 300 paintings and sculptures.

During the campaign, Bonaparte became increasingly influential in French politics. He founded two newspapers: one for the troops in his army and one for circulation in France. The royalists attacked him for looting Italy and warned that he might become a dictator. Bonaparte sent General Charles-Pierre Augereau to Paris to support a coup d'état that purged royalists from the legislative councils on 4 September—the Coup of 18 Fructidor. This left Barras and his republican allies in control again, but more dependent upon Bonaparte, who finalized peace terms with Austria by the Treaty of Campo Formio. Bonaparte returned to Paris on 5 December 1797 as a hero. He met Charles Maurice de Talleyrand, France's foreign minister, and took command of the Army of England for the planned invasion of Britain.

=== Egyptian expedition ===
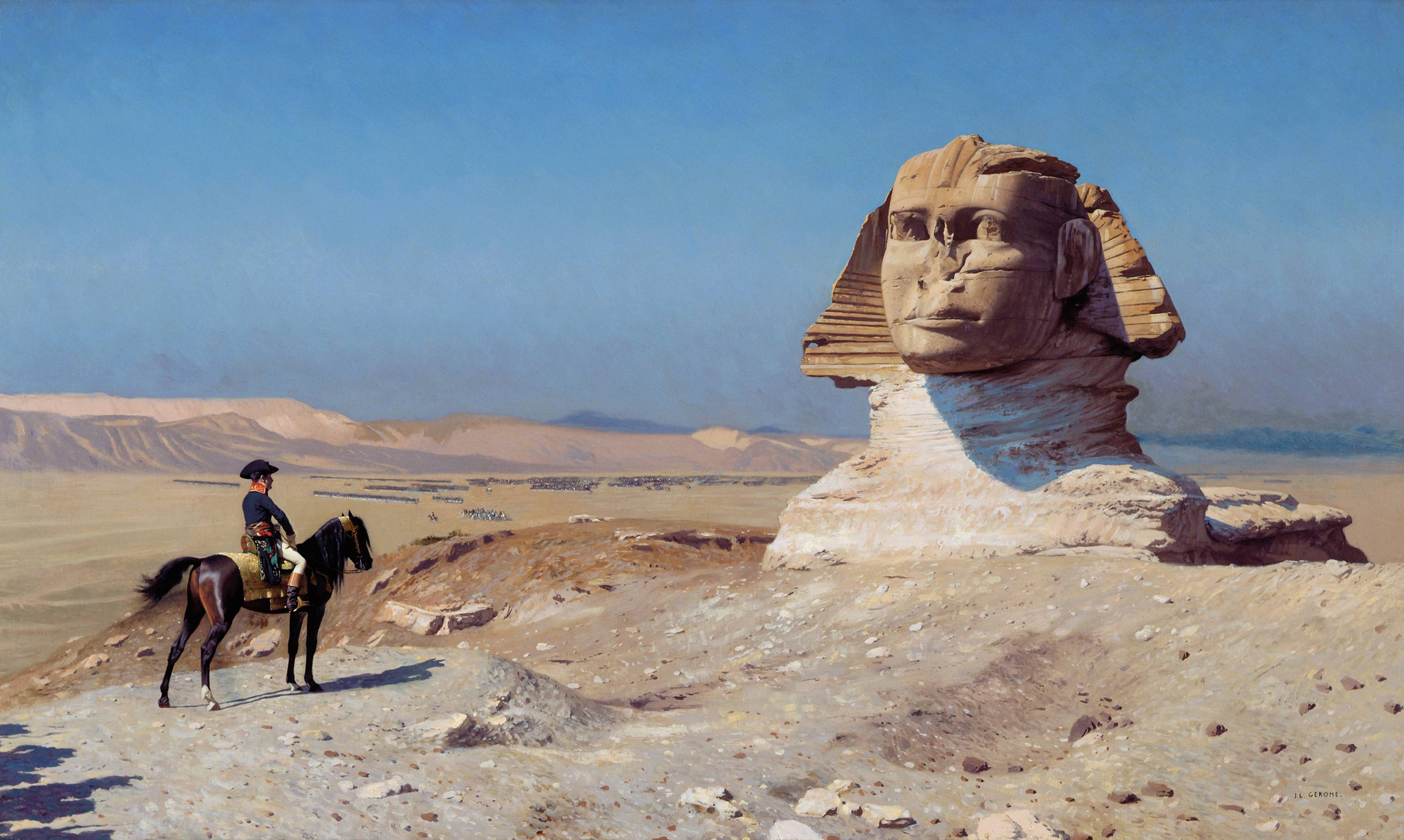
Bonaparte Before the Sphinx (c. 1886) by Jean-Léon Gérôme, Hearst Castle

After two months of planning, Bonaparte decided that France's naval strength was not yet sufficient to confront the Royal Navy. He decided on a military expedition to seize Egypt and thereby undermine Britain's access to its trade interests in India. Bonaparte wished to establish a French presence in the Middle East and join forces with Tipu Sultan, the Sultan of Mysore, an enemy of the British. Bonaparte assured the Directory that "as soon as he had conquered Egypt, he will establish relations with the Indian princes and, together with them, attack the English in their possessions". The Directory agreed in order to secure a trade route to the Indian subcontinent.

In May 1798, Bonaparte was elected a member of the French Academy of Sciences. His Egyptian expedition included a group of 167 scientists, with mathematicians, naturalists, chemists, and geodesists among them. Their discoveries included the Rosetta Stone, and their work was published in the Description de l'Égypte in 1809. En route to Egypt, Bonaparte reached Hospitaller Malta on 9 June 1798, then controlled by the Knights Hospitaller. Grand Master Ferdinand von Hompesch zu Bolheim surrendered after token resistance, and Bonaparte captured an important naval base with the loss of only three men.

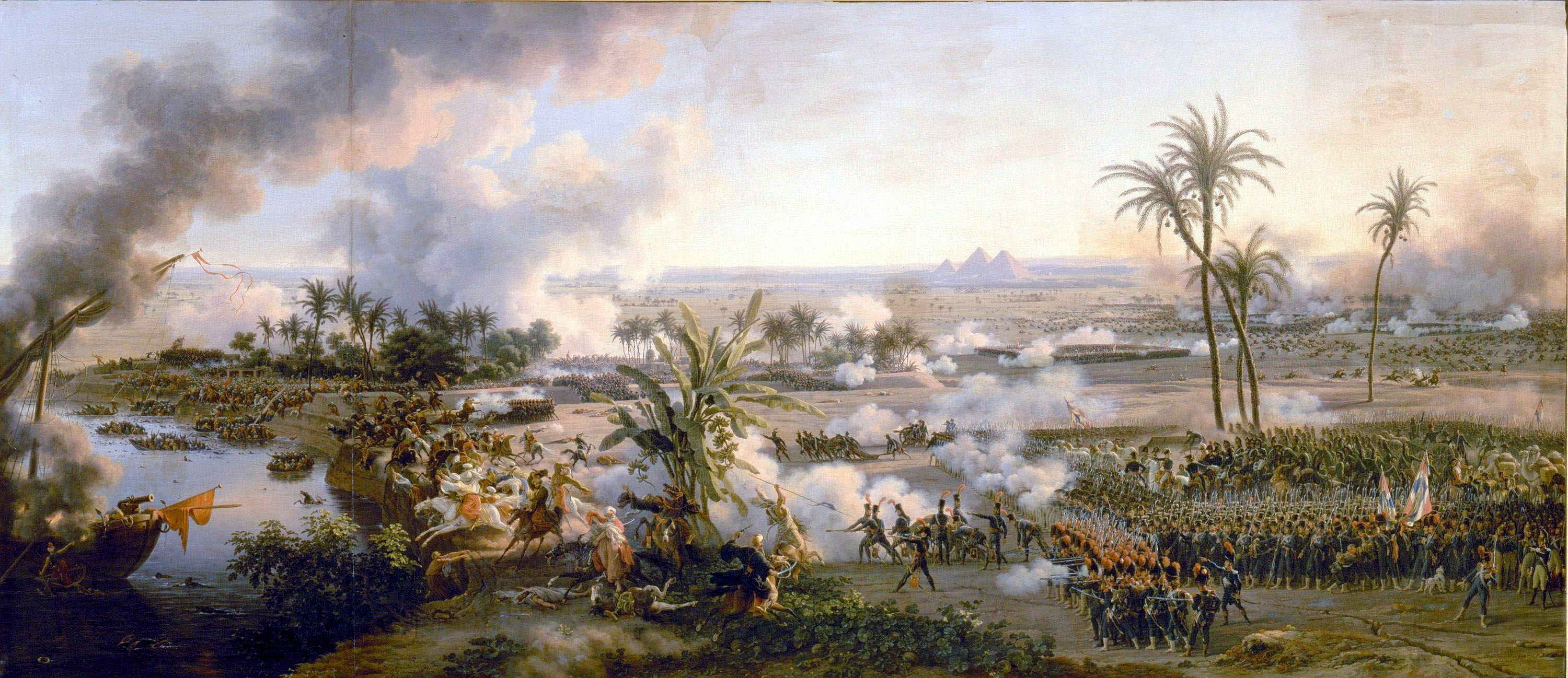
Battle of the Pyramids on 21 July 1798 by Louis-François, Baron Lejeune, 1808

Bonaparte and his expedition eluded pursuit by the Royal Navy and landed at Alexandria on 1 July. He fought the Battle of Shubra Khit against the Mamluks, Egypt's ruling military caste. This helped the French practise their defensive tactic for the Battle of the Pyramids on 21 July, about 24 km (15 mi) from the pyramids. Bonaparte's forces of 25,000 roughly equalled those of the Mamluks' Egyptian cavalry. Twenty-nine French and approximately 2,000 Egyptians were killed. The victory boosted the French army's morale.

On 1 August 1798 the British fleet under Sir Horatio Nelson captured or destroyed all but two vessels of the French fleet in the Battle of the Nile, preventing Bonaparte from strengthening the French position in the Mediterranean. His army had succeeded in a temporary increase of French power in Egypt, though it faced repeated uprisings. In early 1799 he moved an army into the Ottoman province of Damascus (Syria and Galilee). Bonaparte led these 13,000 French soldiers in the conquest of the coastal towns of Arish, Gaza, Jaffa, and Haifa. The attack on Jaffa was particularly brutal. Bonaparte discovered that many of the defenders were former prisoners of war, ostensibly on parole, so he ordered the garrison and some 1,500–5,000 prisoners to be executed by bayonet or drowning. Men, women, and children were robbed and murdered for three days.

Bonaparte began with an army of 13,000 men. 1,500 were reported missing, 1,200 died in combat, and thousands perished from disease—mostly bubonic plague. He failed to reduce the fortress of Acre, so he marched his army back to Egypt in May. Bonaparte was alleged to have ordered plague-stricken men to be poisoned with opium to speed the retreat. Back in Egypt on 25 July, Bonaparte defeated an Ottoman amphibious invasion at Abukir.

Bonaparte stayed informed of European affairs. He learned that France had suffered a series of defeats in the War of the Second Coalition. On 24 August 1799, fearing that the Republic's future was in doubt, he took advantage of the temporary departure of British ships from French coastal ports and set sail for France, despite the fact that he had received no explicit orders from Paris. The army was left in the charge of Jean-Baptiste Kléber.

== Ruler of France ==
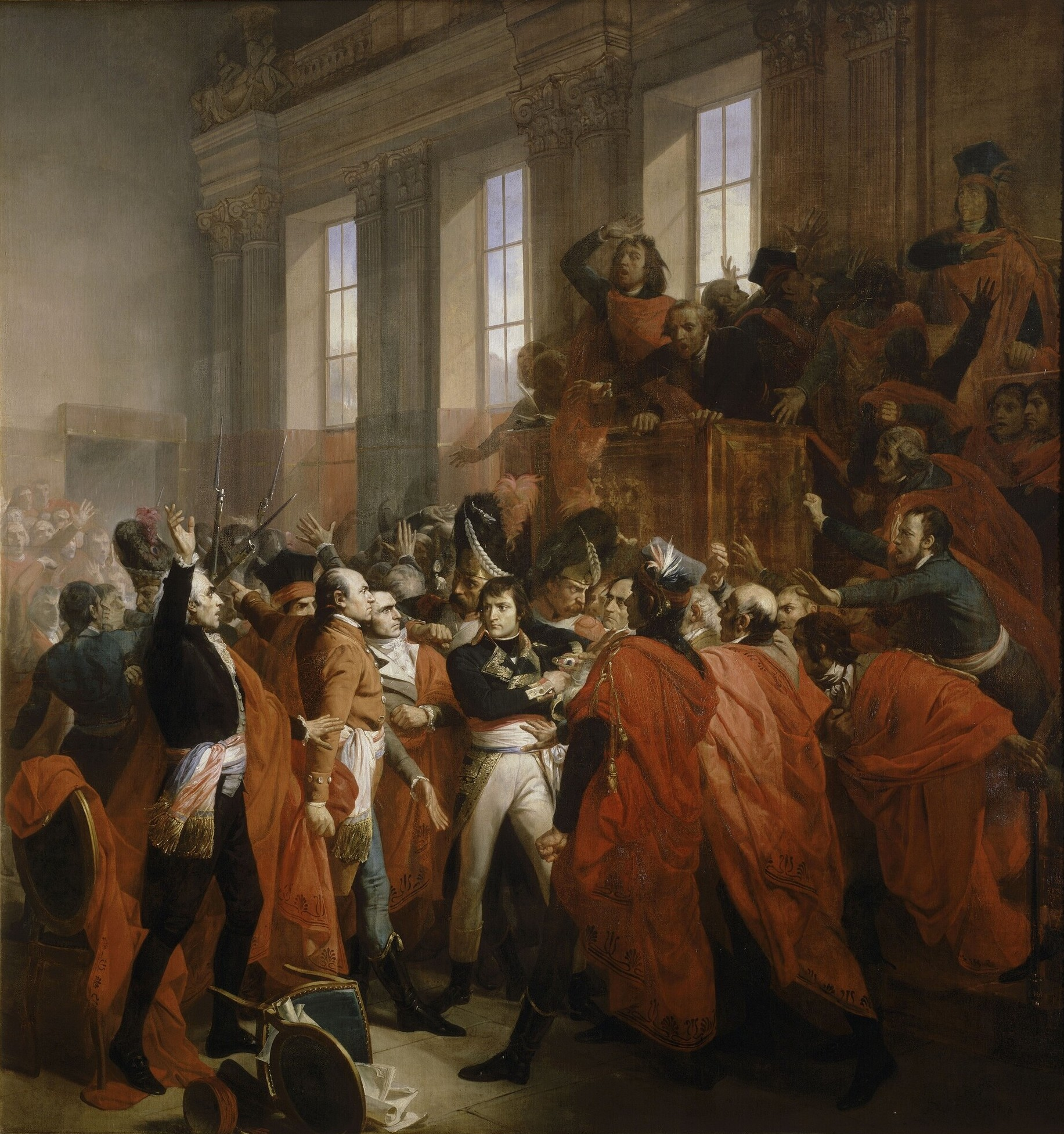
Bonaparte at the Council of Five Hundred at Saint-Cloud by François Bouchot, 1840

=== 18 Brumaire ===
Unknown to Bonaparte, the Directory had sent him orders to return from Egypt with his army to ward off a possible invasion of France, but these messages never arrived. By the time he reached Paris in October, France's situation had been improved by a series of victories. The republic, however, was bankrupt, and the ineffective Directory was unpopular. Despite the failures in Egypt, Bonaparte returned to a hero's welcome. The Directory discussed Bonaparte's desertion but was too weak to punish him.

Bonaparte formed an alliance with Talleyrand and leading members of the Council of Five Hundred and Directory—Lucien Bonaparte, Emmanuel Joseph Sieyès, Roger Ducos and Joseph Fouché—to overthrow the government. On 9 November 1799 (18 Brumaire according to the revolutionary calendar), the conspirators launched a coup and the following day, backed by grenadiers with fixed bayonets, forced the Council of Five Hundred to dissolve the Directory and appoint Bonaparte, Sieyès and Ducos provisional consuls.

=== French Consulate ===
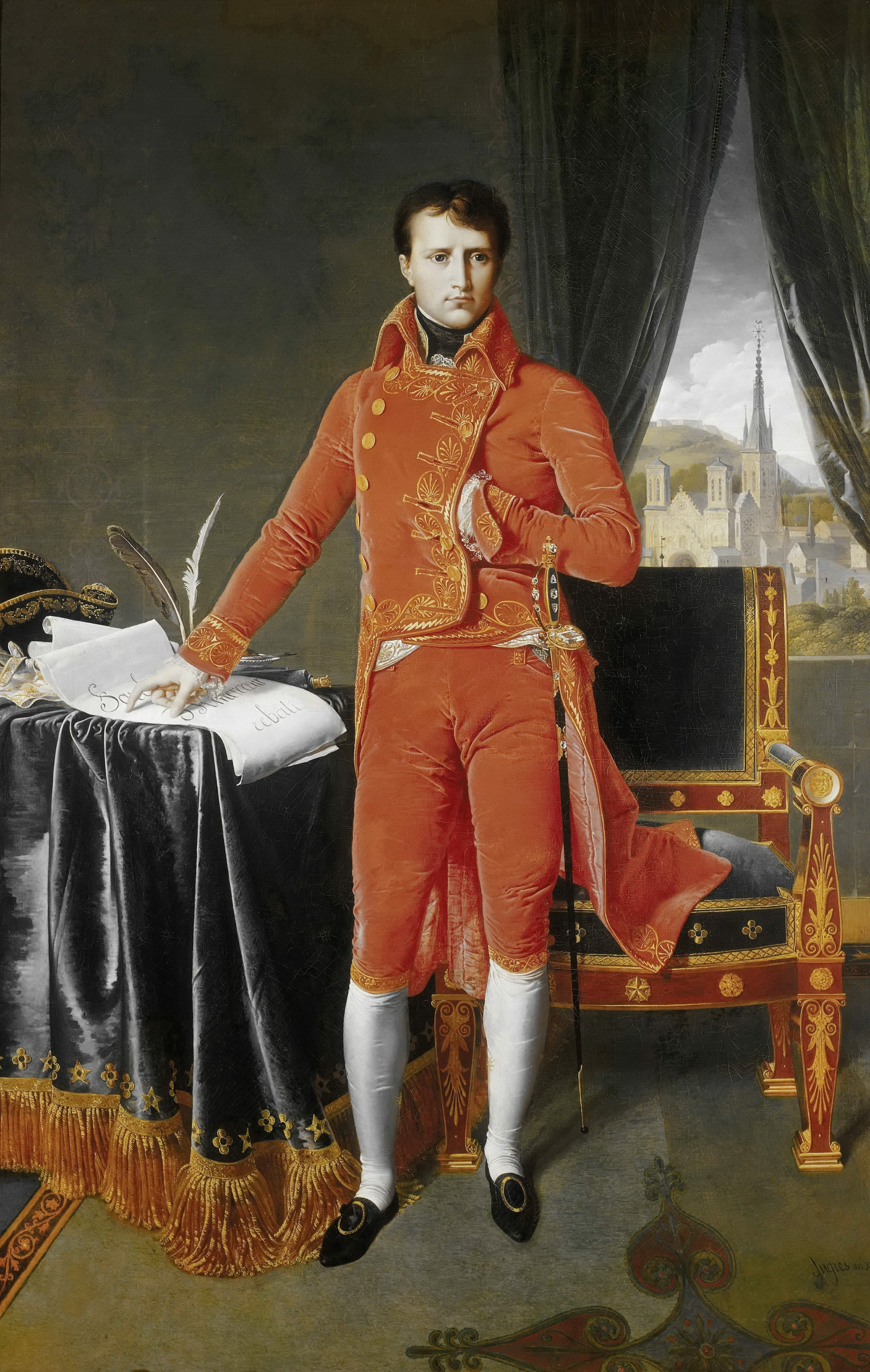
Bonaparte, First Consul, by Jean-Auguste-Dominique Ingres. Posing the hand inside the waistcoat was often used in portraits of rulers to indicate calm and stable leadership.

On 13 December, Bonaparte introduced the Constitution of the Year VIII, under which three consuls were appointed for 10 years. Real power lay with Bonaparte as first consul, and his preferred candidates Cambacérès and Charles-François Lebrun were appointed as second and third consuls who only had an advisory role. The constitution also established a Legislative Body and Tribunate which were selected from indirectly elected candidates, and a Senate and Council of State which were effectively nominated by the executive. The constitution was approved by plebiscite on 7 February 1800. The official count was over three million in favour and 1,562 against. Lucien, however, had doubled the count of the "yes" vote to give the false impression that a majority of those eligible to vote had approved the constitution.

Historians have variously described Bonaparte's regime as "dictatorship by plebiscite", "absolutist rule decked out in the spirit of the age", and "soft despotism". Local and regional administration was reformed to concentrate power in the central government, censorship was introduced, and most opposition newspapers were closed down to stifle dissent. Royalist and regional revolts were dealt with by a combination of amnesties for those who lay down their arms and brutal repression of those who continued to resist. Bonaparte also improved state finances by securing loans under a promise to defend private property, raising taxes on tobacco, alcohol and salt, and extracting levies from France's satellite republics.

Bonaparte believed that the best way to secure his regime was by a victorious peace. In May 1800, he led an army across the Swiss Alps into Italy, aiming to surprise the Austrian armies that had reoccupied the peninsula when Bonaparte was still in Egypt. After a difficult crossing over the Alps, (Note: This is depicted in Bonaparte Crossing the Alps by Hippolyte Delaroche and in Jacques-Louis David's imperial Napoleon Crossing the Alps. He is less realistically portrayed on a charger in the latter work.) the French captured Milan on 2 June. The French confronted an Austrian army under Michael von Melas at the battle of Marengo on 14 June. The Austrians fielded about 30,000 soldiers while Bonaparte commanded 24,000 troops. The Austrians' initial attack surprised the French who were gradually driven back. Late in the afternoon, however, a full division under French General Louis Desaix arrived on the field and reversed the tide of the battle. The Austrian army fled leaving behind 14,000 casualties. The following day, the Austrians signed an armistice and agreed to abandon northern Italy.

When peace negotiations with Austria stalled, Bonaparte reopened hostilities in November. A French army under General Jean Victor Marie Moreau swept through Bavaria and scored an overwhelming victory over the Austrians at the battle of Hohenlinden in December. The Austrians capitulated and signed the Treaty of Lunéville in February 1801. The treaty reaffirmed and expanded earlier French gains at Campo Formio. On 26 January 1802, following the Consulte de Lyon, Napoleon was declared president of the Italian Republic.

Bonaparte's triumph at Marengo increased his popularity and political authority. However, he still faced royalist plots and feared Jacobin influence, especially in the army. Several assassination plots, including the Conspiration des poignards (Dagger plot) in October 1800 and the Plot of the Rue Saint-Nicaise two months later, gave him a pretext to arrest about 100 suspected Jacobins and royalists, some of whom were shot and many others deported to penal colonies.

==== Temporary peace in Europe ====
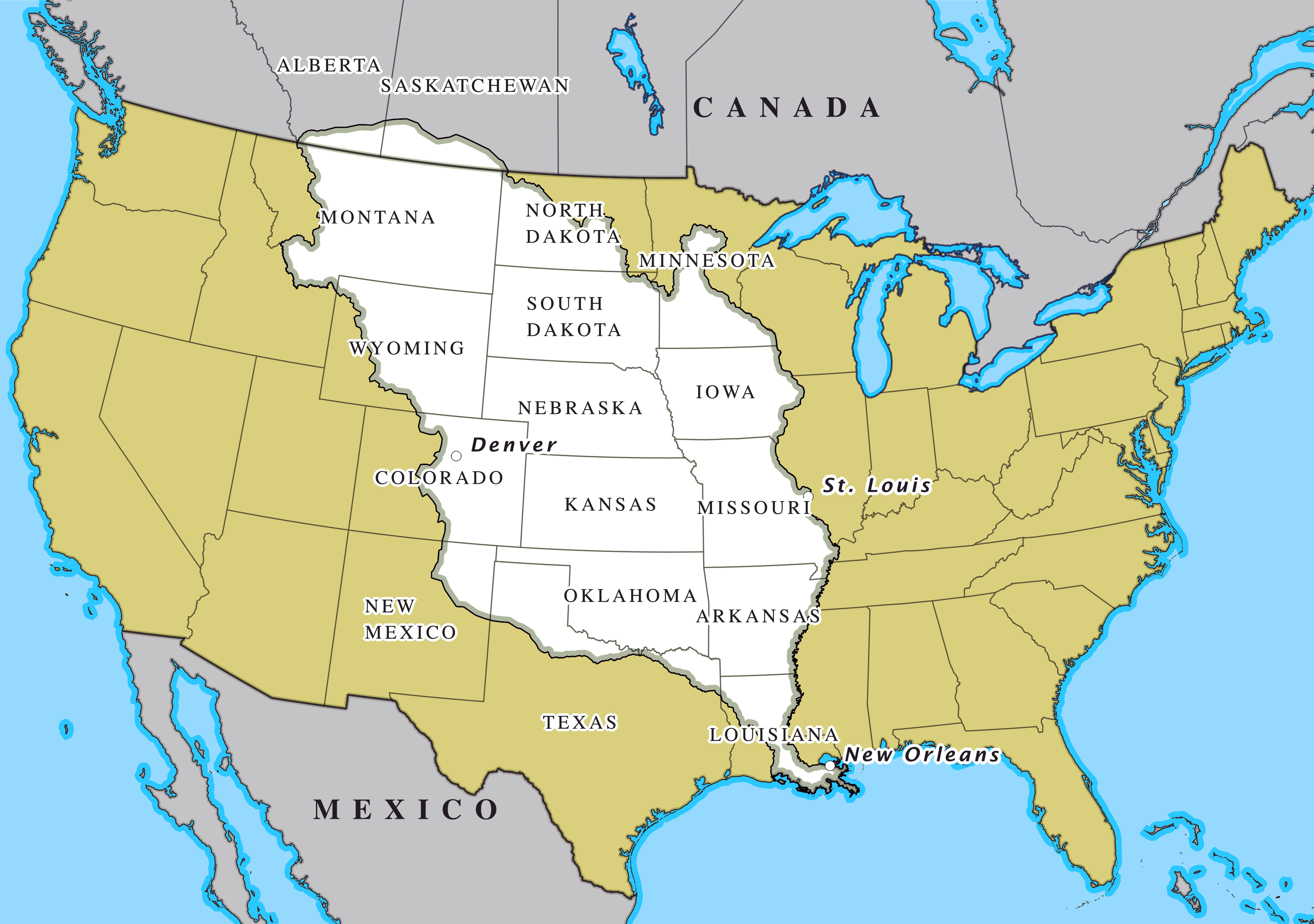
The 1803 Louisiana Purchase totalled 2,144,480 square kilometres (827,987 square miles), doubling the size of the United States.

After a decade of war, France and Britain signed the Treaty of Amiens in March 1802, bringing the Revolutionary Wars to an end. Under the treaty, Britain agreed to withdraw from most of the colonies it had recently captured from France and her allies, and France agreed to evacuate Naples. In April, Bonaparte publicly celebrated the peace and his controversial Concordat of 1801 with Pope Pius VII under which the pope recognized Bonaparte's regime and the regime recognized Catholicism as the majority religion of France. In a further step towards national reconciliation (known as "fusion"), Bonaparte offered an amnesty to most émigrés who wished to return to France.

With Europe at peace and the economy recovering, Bonaparte became increasingly popular, both domestically and abroad. In May 1802, the Council of State recommended a new plebiscite asking the French people to make "Napoleon Bonaparte" consul for life. (It was the first time his first name was officially used by the regime.) About 3.6 million voted "yes" and 8,374 "no." 40–60% of eligible Frenchmen voted, the highest turnout for a plebiscite since the revolution.

France had regained her overseas colonies under Amiens but did not control them all. The French National Convention had voted to abolish slavery in February 1794, but in May 1802 Bonaparte reintroduced it in all the recovered colonies except Saint-Domingue and Guadeloupe which were under the control of rebel generals. A French military expedition under Antoine Richepance regained control of Guadeloupe, and slavery was reintroduced there on 16 July.

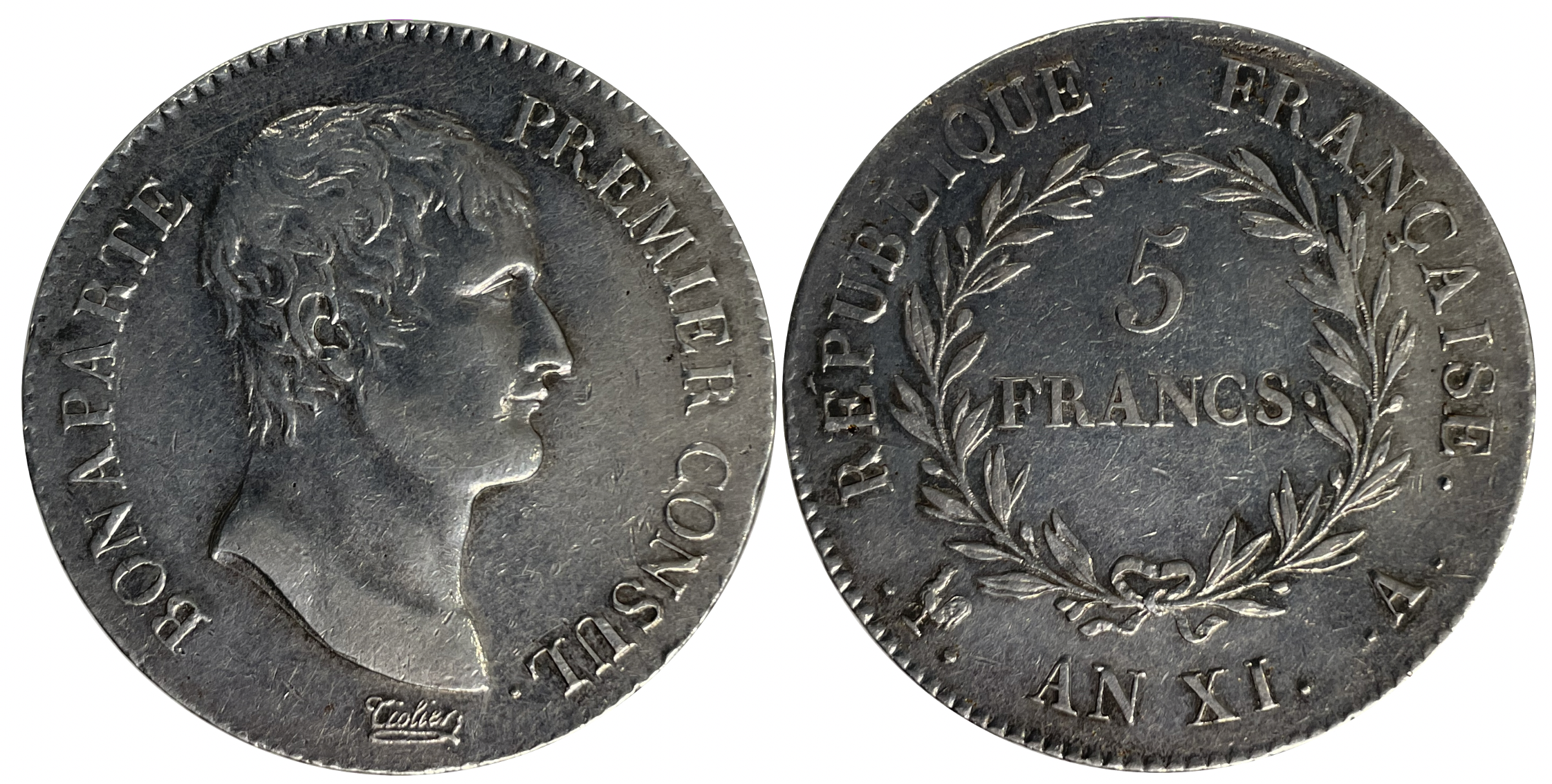
Silver 5 francs coin depicting Napoleon as First Consul from AN XI, 1802

Saint-Domingue was the most profitable of the colonies – a major source of sugar, coffee and indigo – but was under the control of the former slave Toussaint Louverture. Bonaparte sent the Saint-Domingue expedition under his brother-in-law General Charles Leclerc to retake the colony, and they landed there in February 1802 with 29,000 men. Although Toussaint was captured and sent to France in July, the expedition ultimately failed due to high rates of disease and a string of defeats against rebel commander Jean-Jacques Dessalines. In May 1803 Bonaparte acknowledged defeat, and the last 8,000 French troops left the island. The former slaves proclaimed the independent republic of Haiti in 1804.

As war with Britain again loomed in 1803, Bonaparte realized that his American colony of Louisiana would be difficult to defend. In need of funds, he agreed to the Louisiana Purchase with the United States, doubling the latter's size. The price was $15 million. The peace with Britain was uneasy. Britain did not evacuate Malta as promised and protested against Bonaparte's annexation of Piedmont and his Act of Mediation (19 February), which established a Swiss Confederation. Neither of these territories were covered by Amiens, but they inflamed tensions significantly, as did Bonaparte's occupation of Holland and apparent ambitions in India. The dispute culminated in a declaration of war by Britain in May 1803. Bonaparte responded by reassembling the invasion camp at Boulogne and ordering the arrest of every British male between 18 and 60 years old in France and its dependencies as a prisoner of war.

=== French Empire ===
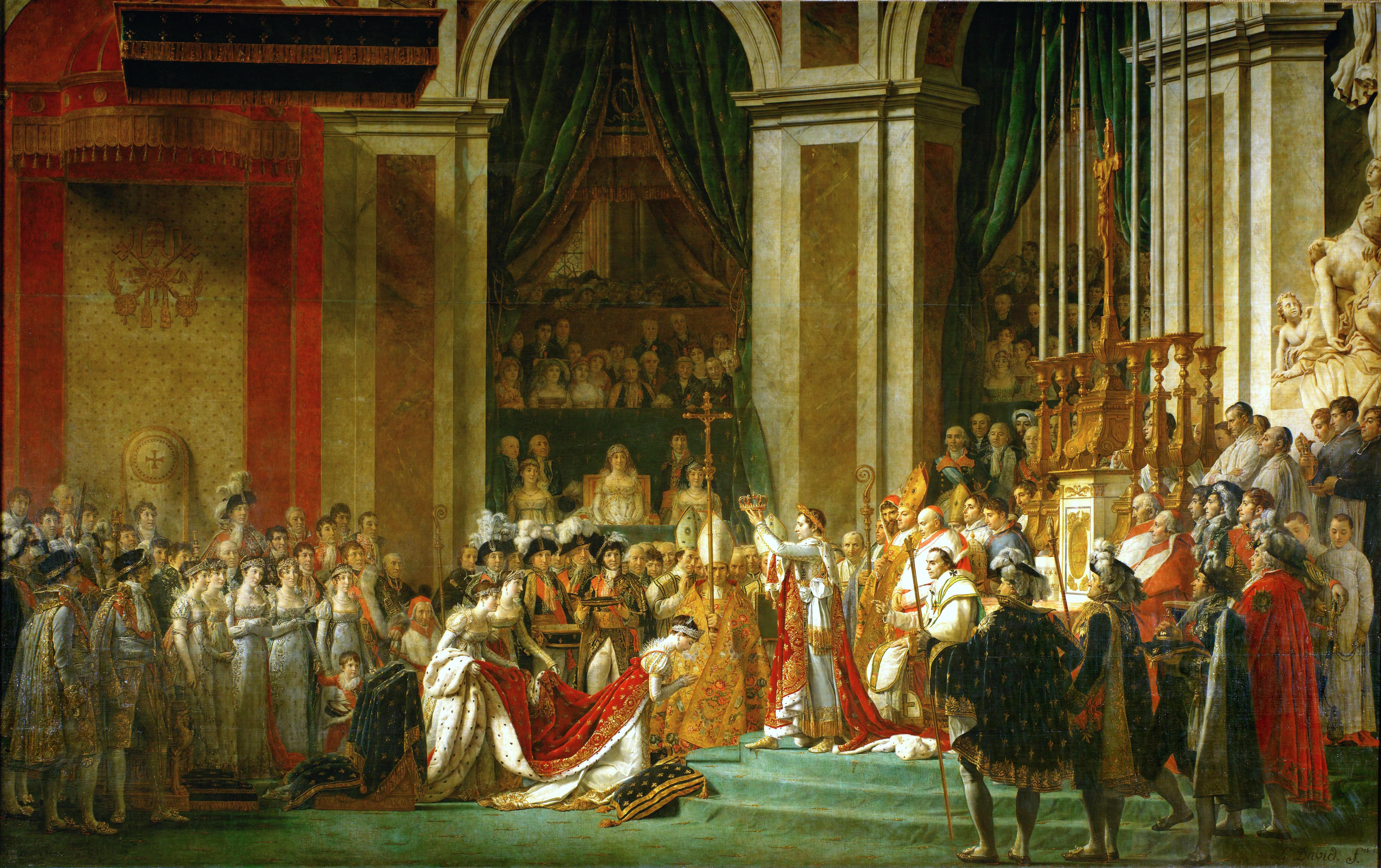
The Coronation of Napoleon by Jacques-Louis David (1804)

==== Bonaparte becomes Napoleon I ====
In February 1804 Bonaparte's police made a series of arrests in relation to a royalist plot to kidnap or assassinate him that involved the British government, Moreau and an unnamed Bourbon prince. On the advice of his foreign minister, Talleyrand, Napoleon ordered the kidnapping of the Duke of Enghien, violating the sovereignty of Baden. The duke was quickly executed after a secret military trial, even though there was no proof he had been involved in the plot. Enghien's kidnapping and execution infuriated royalists and monarchs throughout Europe and drew a formal protest from Russia.

Following the royalist plot, Bonaparte's supporters convinced him to convert the Consulate into a monarchy. They argued that the presence of an heir would help to secure the regime in case of his death. As well, they believed a monarchy would make Napoleon more acceptable to constitutional monarchists, and put France on the same footing as other European monarchies. On 18 May the senate proclaimed Napoleon Emperor of the French and approved a new constitution. The following day, Napoleon appointed 18 of his leading generals Marshals of the Empire.

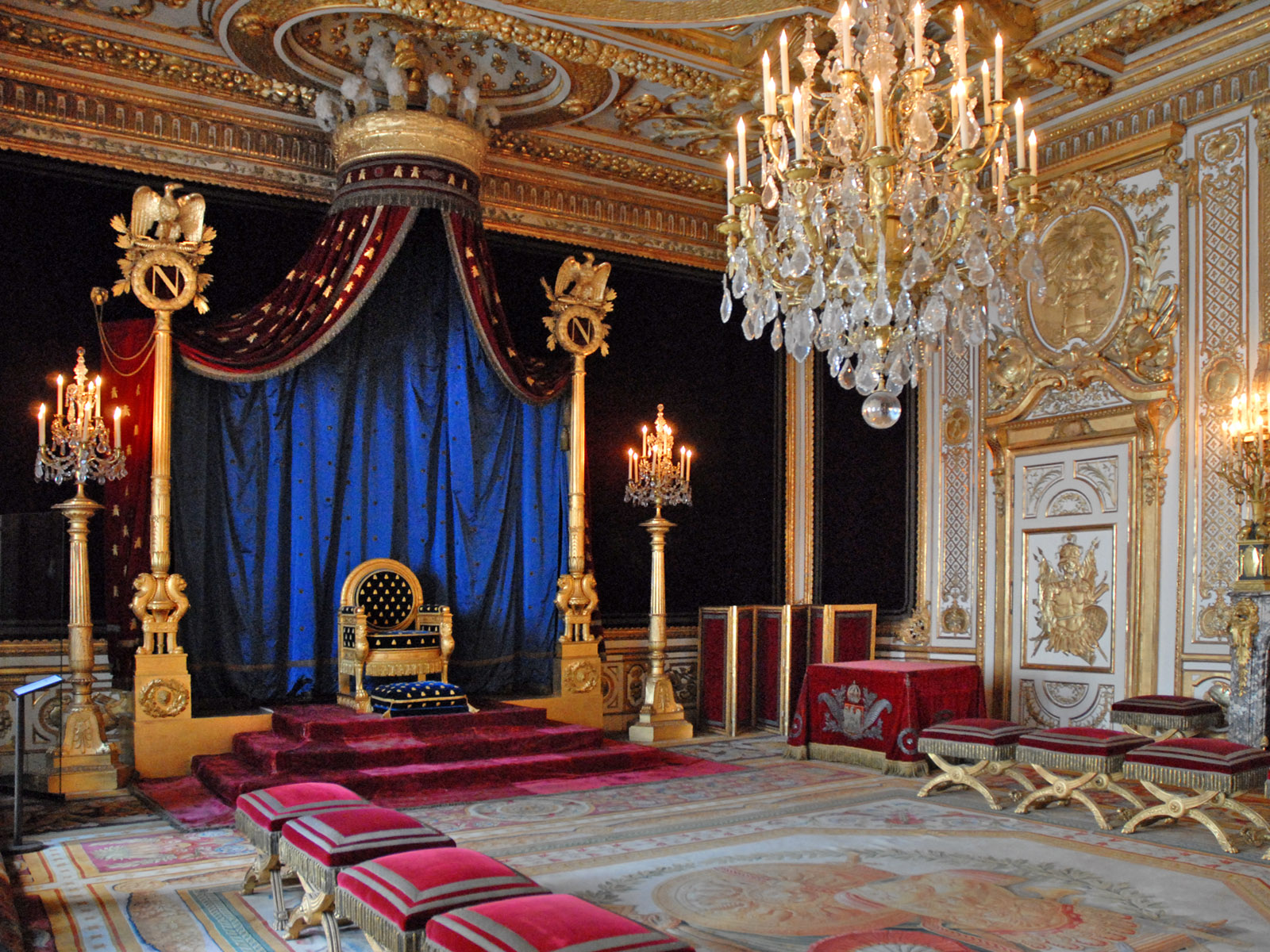
Napoleon's throne room at Fontainebleau

The hereditary empire was confirmed by a plebiscite in June. The official result showed 3.5 million voted "yes" and 2,569 voted "no". The yes count, however, was falsely inflated by 300,000 to 500,000 votes. The turnout, at 35%, was below the figure for the previous plebiscite. Britain, Russia, Sweden and the Ottoman Empire refused to recognize Napoleon's title. Austria, however, recognized Napoleon as Emperor of the French in return for his recognition of Francis I as Emperor of Austria.

Napoleon's coronation, with the participation of Pope Pius VII, took place at Notre Dame de Paris on 2 December 1804. After having been anointed by the pope, Napoleon crowned himself with a replica of Charlemagne's crown. He then crowned Joséphine, who became the second woman in French history, after Marie de' Medici, to be crowned and anointed. He then swore an oath to defend the territory of the republic; to respect the Concordat, freedom of worship, political and civil liberty and the sale of nationalized lands; to raise no taxes except by law; to maintain the Legion of Honour; and to govern in the interests, wellbeing and the glory of the French people.

On 17 March 1805 Napoleon declared himself King of Italy and crowned himself with the Iron Crown of Lombardy at the Cathedral of Milan. Austria saw this as a provocation because of its own territorial interests in Italy. When Napoleon incorporated Genoa and Liguria into his empire, Austria formally protested against this violation of the Treaty of Lunéville.

==== War of the Third Coalition ====
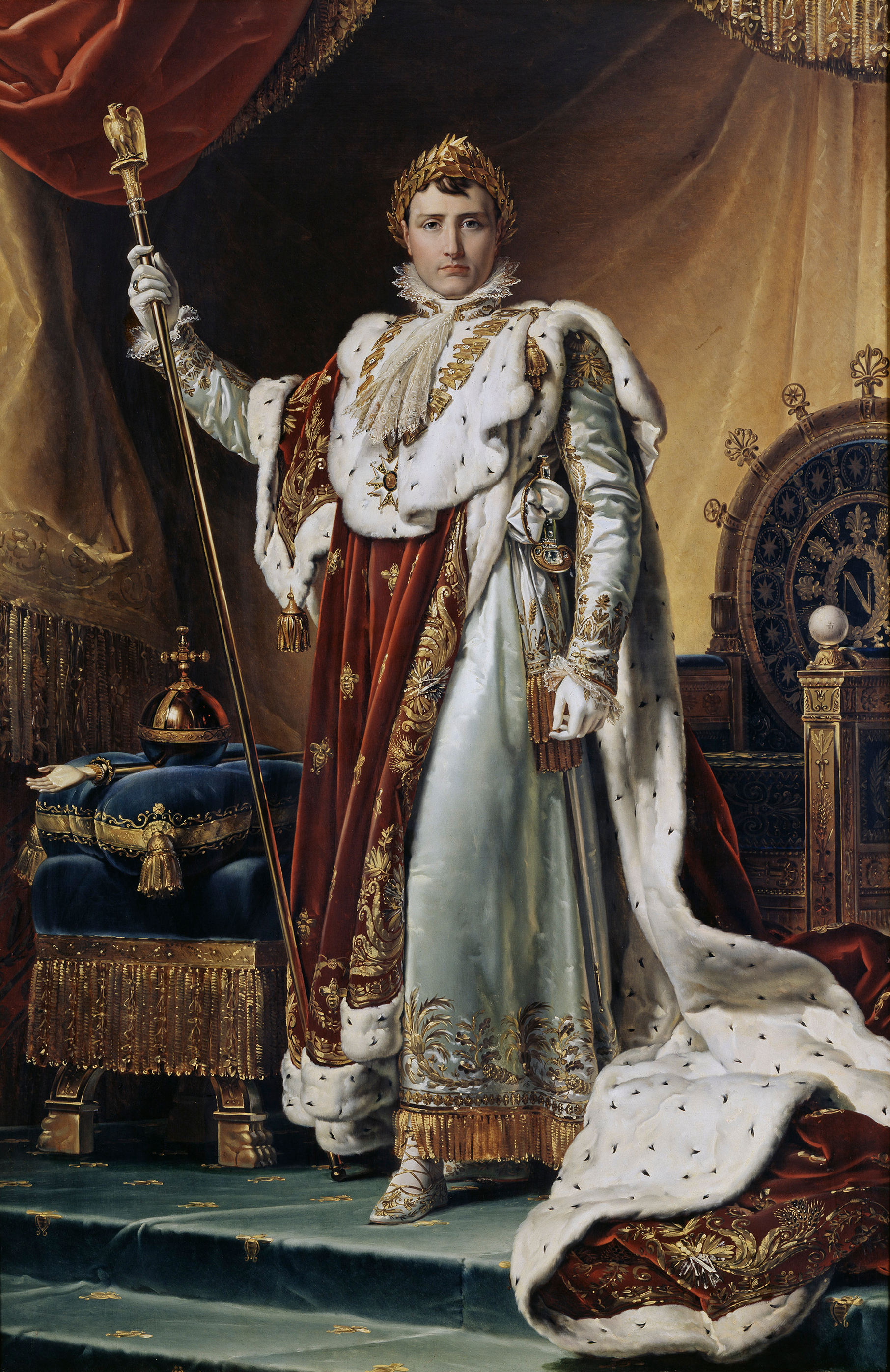
Napoleon in his coronation robes by François Gérard, c. 1805

By September 1805 Sweden, Russia, Austria, Naples and the Ottoman Empire had joined Britain in a coalition against France. In 1803 and 1804 Napoleon had assembled a force around Boulogne for an invasion of Britain. They never invaded, but the force formed the core of Napoleon's Grande Armée, created in August 1805. At the start, this French army had about 200,000 men organized into seven corps, artillery and cavalry reserves, and the élite Imperial Guard. By August 1805 the Grande Armée had grown to a force of 350,000 men, who were well equipped, well trained, and led by competent officers.

To facilitate the invasion, Napoleon planned to lure the Royal Navy from the English Channel by a diversionary attack on the British West Indies. However, the plan unravelled after the British victory at the Battle of Cape Finisterre in July 1805. French Admiral Pierre-Charles Villeneuve retreated to Cádiz instead of linking up with French naval forces at Brest for an attack on the English Channel. Facing a potential invasion from his continental enemies, Napoleon abandoned his invasion of England and sought to destroy the isolated Austrian armies in southern Germany before their Russian ally could arrive in force. On 25 September, 200,000 French troops began to cross the Rhine on a front of 260 km (160 mi).

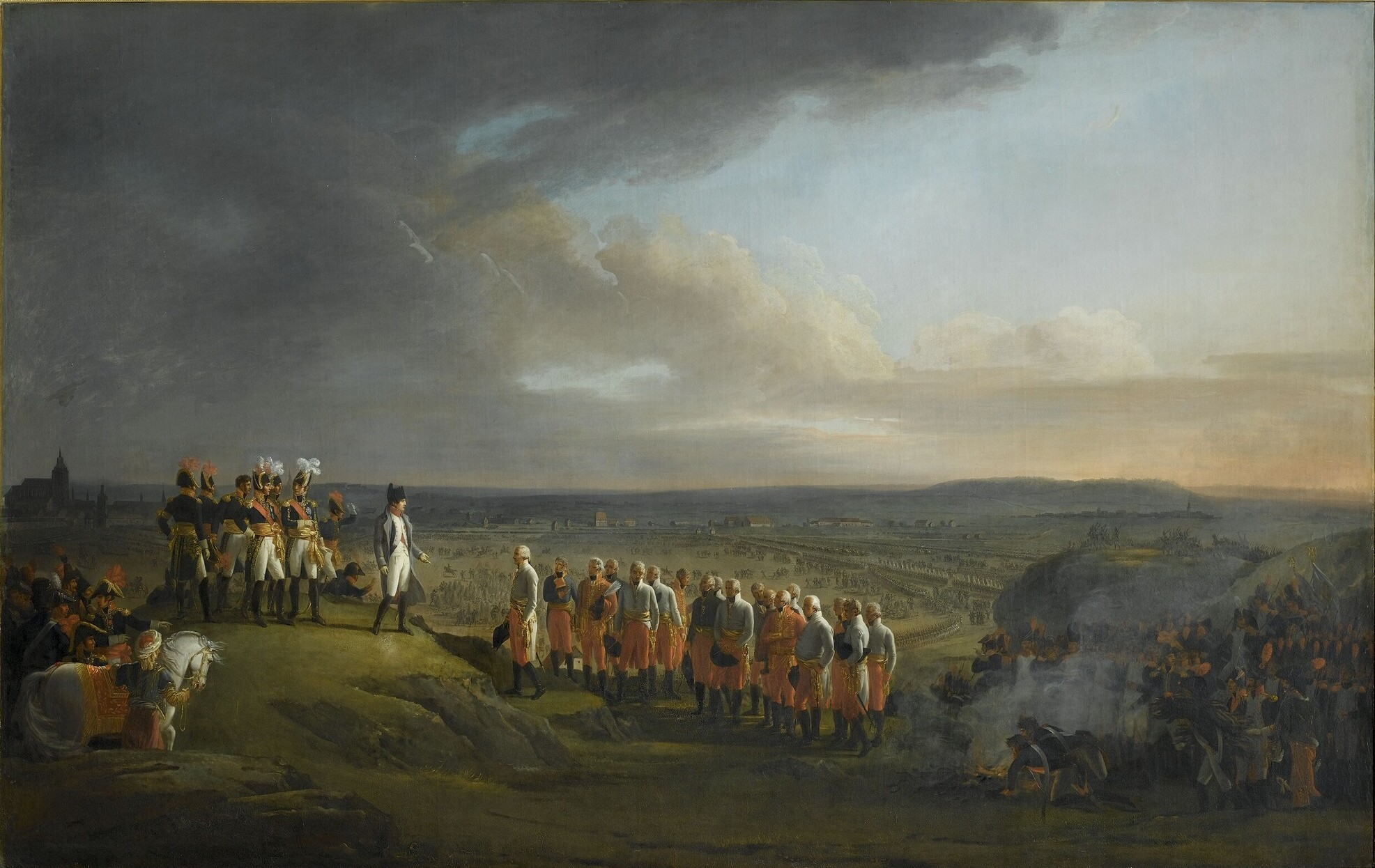
Napoleon and the Grande Armée receive the surrender of Austrian General Mack after the Battle of Ulm in October 1805.

Austrian commander Karl Mack von Leiberich had gathered most of the Austrian army at the fortress of Ulm in Swabia. Napoleon's army, however, moved quickly and outflanked the Austrian positions. After some minor engagements that culminated in the Battle of Ulm, Mack surrendered. With 2,000 French casualties, Napoleon had captured 60,000 Austrian soldiers through his army's rapid marching. For the French, this spectacular victory on land was soured by the decisive victory that the Royal Navy attained at the Battle of Trafalgar on 21 October. After Trafalgar, the Royal Navy was never again seriously challenged by Napoleon's fleet.

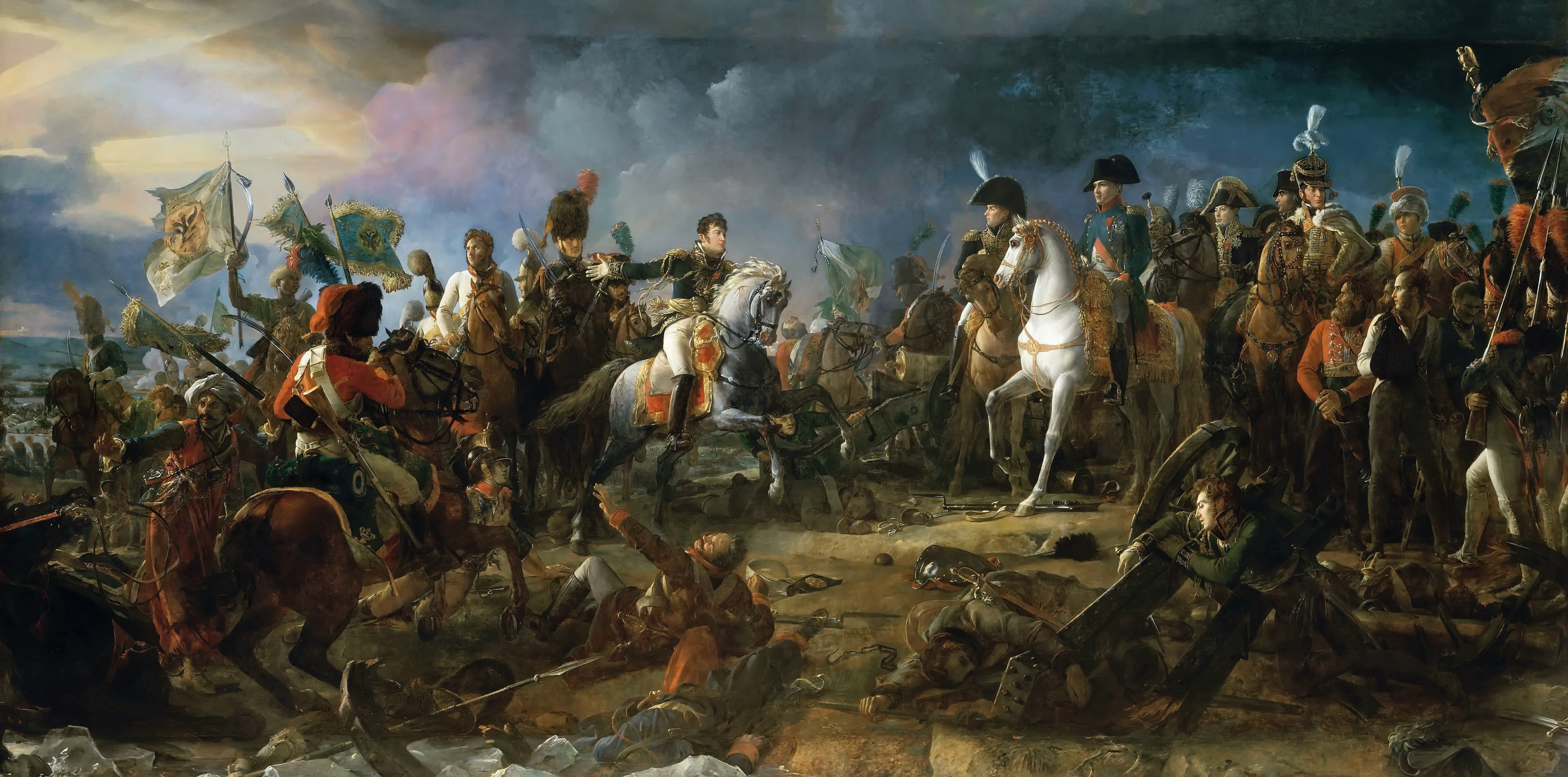
Napoleon at the Battle of Austerlitz, by François Gérard, 1805

French forces occupied Vienna in November, capturing 100,000 muskets, 500 cannons, and the intact bridges across the Danube. Napoleon then sent his army north in pursuit of the allies. Tsar Alexander I of Russia and Francis I decided to engage Napoleon in battle, despite reservations from some of their subordinates. At the Battle of Austerlitz on 2 December, Napoleon deployed his army below the Pratzen Heights. He ordered his right wing to feign retreat, enticing the allies to descend from the heights in pursuit. The French centre and left wing then captured the heights and caught the allies in a pincer movement. Thousands of Russian troops fled across a frozen lake to escape the trap, and 100 to 2,000 of them drowned. About a third of the allied forces were killed, captured or wounded.

The disaster at Austerlitz led Austria to seek an armistice. By the subsequent Treaty of Pressburg, signed on 26 December, Austria left the coalition, lost substantial territory to the Kingdom of Italy and Bavaria, and was forced to pay an indemnity of 40 million francs. Alexander's army was granted safe passage back to Russia. Napoleon went on to say, "The battle of Austerlitz is the finest of all I have fought". Frank McLynn suggests that Napoleon was so successful at Austerlitz that he lost touch with reality, and what used to be French foreign policy became a "personal Napoleonic one". Vincent Cronin disagrees, stating that Napoleon was not overly ambitious for himself, "he embodied the ambitions of thirty million Frenchmen".

==== Middle-Eastern alliances ====
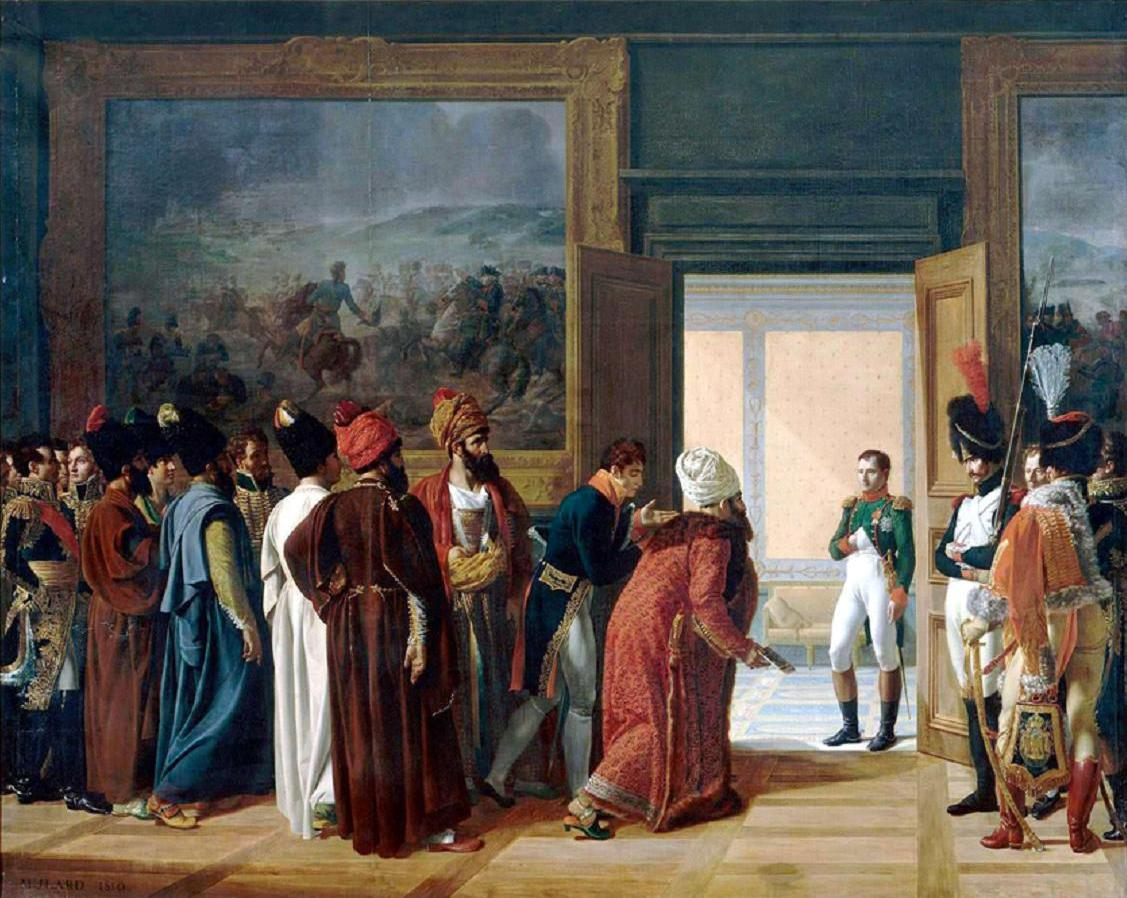
The Iranian envoy Mirza Mohammad-Reza Qazvini meeting with Napoleon at the Finckenstein Palace in West Prussia, 27 April 1807, to sign the Treaty of Finckenstein.

Napoleon continued to entertain a grand scheme to establish a French presence in the Middle East in order to put pressure on Britain and Russia, possibly by forming an alliance with the Ottoman Empire. In February 1806, Ottoman Emperor Selim III recognized Napoleon as emperor. He also opted for an alliance with France, calling France "our sincere and natural ally". That decision brought the Ottoman Empire into a losing war against Russia and Britain. A Franco-Persian alliance was formed between Napoleon and the Persian Empire of Fat′h-Ali Shah Qajar. It collapsed in 1807 when France and Russia formed an unexpected alliance. In the end, Napoleon made no effective alliances in the Middle East.

==== War of the Fourth Coalition and Tilsit ====
After Austerlitz, Napoleon increased his political power in Europe. In 1806, he deposed the Bourbon king of Naples and installed his elder brother, Joseph, on the throne. He then made his younger brother, Louis, king of Holland. On 12 July he established the Confederation of the Rhine, a collection of German states intended to serve as a buffer zone between France and Central Europe. The creation of the confederation spelled the end of the Holy Roman Empire.

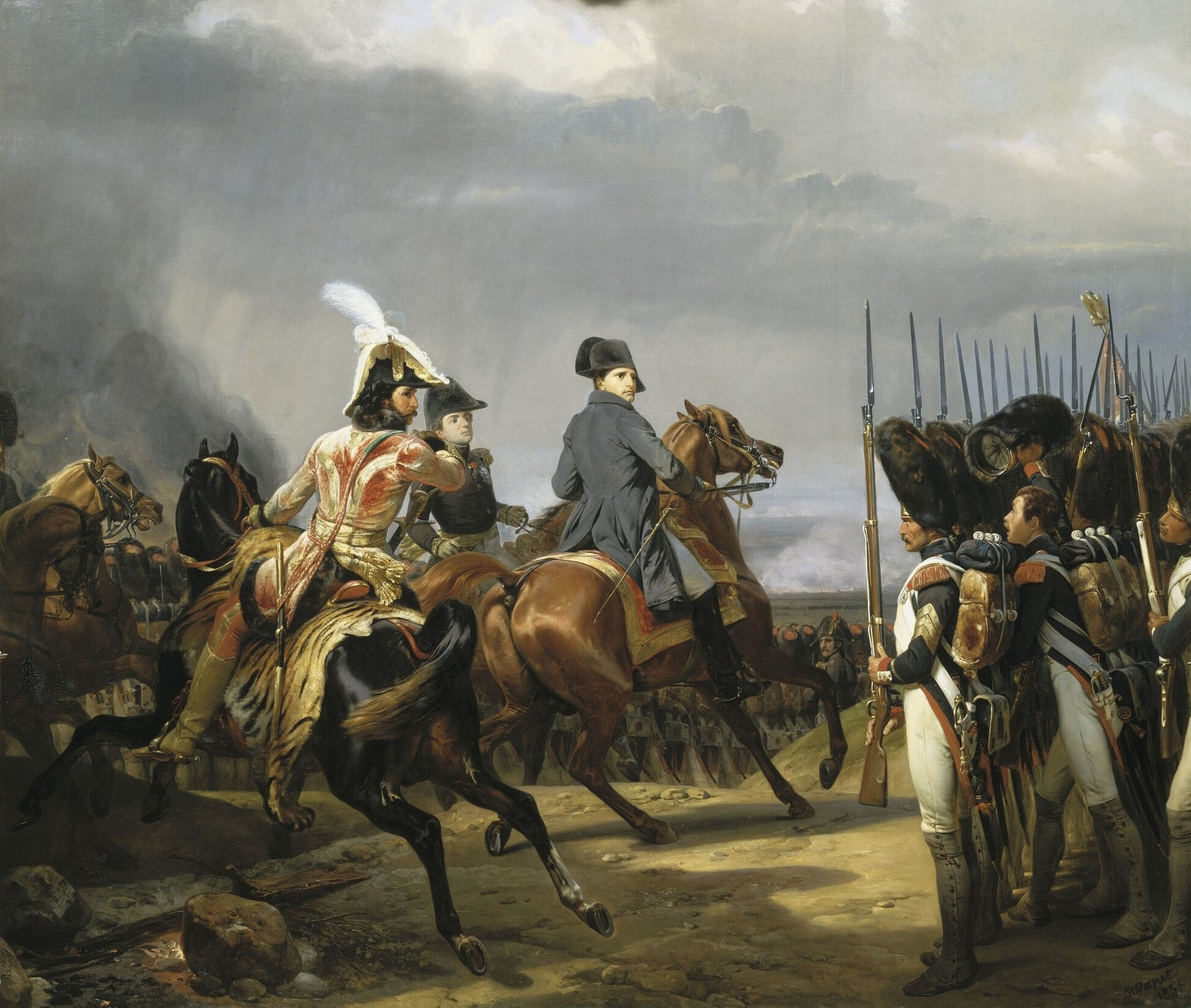
Napoleon reviewing the Imperial Guard before the Battle of Jena, 14 October 1806

Napoleon's growing influence in Germany threatened the status of Prussia as a great power and in response Frederick William III decided on war with France. Prussia and Russia signed a military alliance creating the fourth coalition against France. Prussia, however, committed a strategic blunder by declaring war when French troops were still in southern Germany and months before sufficient Russian troops could reach the front. Napoleon invaded Prussia with 180,000 troops, rapidly marching on the right bank of the River Saale. Upon learning the whereabouts of the Prussian army, the French swung westwards thus cutting the Prussians off from Berlin and the slowly approaching Russians. At the twin battles of Jena and Auerstedt, fought on 14 October, the French convincingly defeated the Prussians and inflicted heavy casualties. With several major commanders dead or incapacitated, the Prussian king proved incapable of effectively commanding the army, which quickly disintegrated.

In the following month, the French captured 140,000 soldiers and over 2,000 cannon. Despite their overwhelming defeat, the Prussians refused to negotiate with the French until the Russians had an opportunity to enter the fight. Following his triumph, Napoleon imposed the first elements of the Continental System through the Berlin Decree issued in November 1806. The Continental System, which prohibited European nations from trading with Britain, was widely violated throughout his reign. In the next few months, Napoleon marched against the advancing Russian armies through Poland and fought a bloody stalemate at the Battle of Eylau in February 1807. After a period of rest and consolidation on both sides, the war restarted in June with an initial struggle at Heilsberg that proved indecisive.

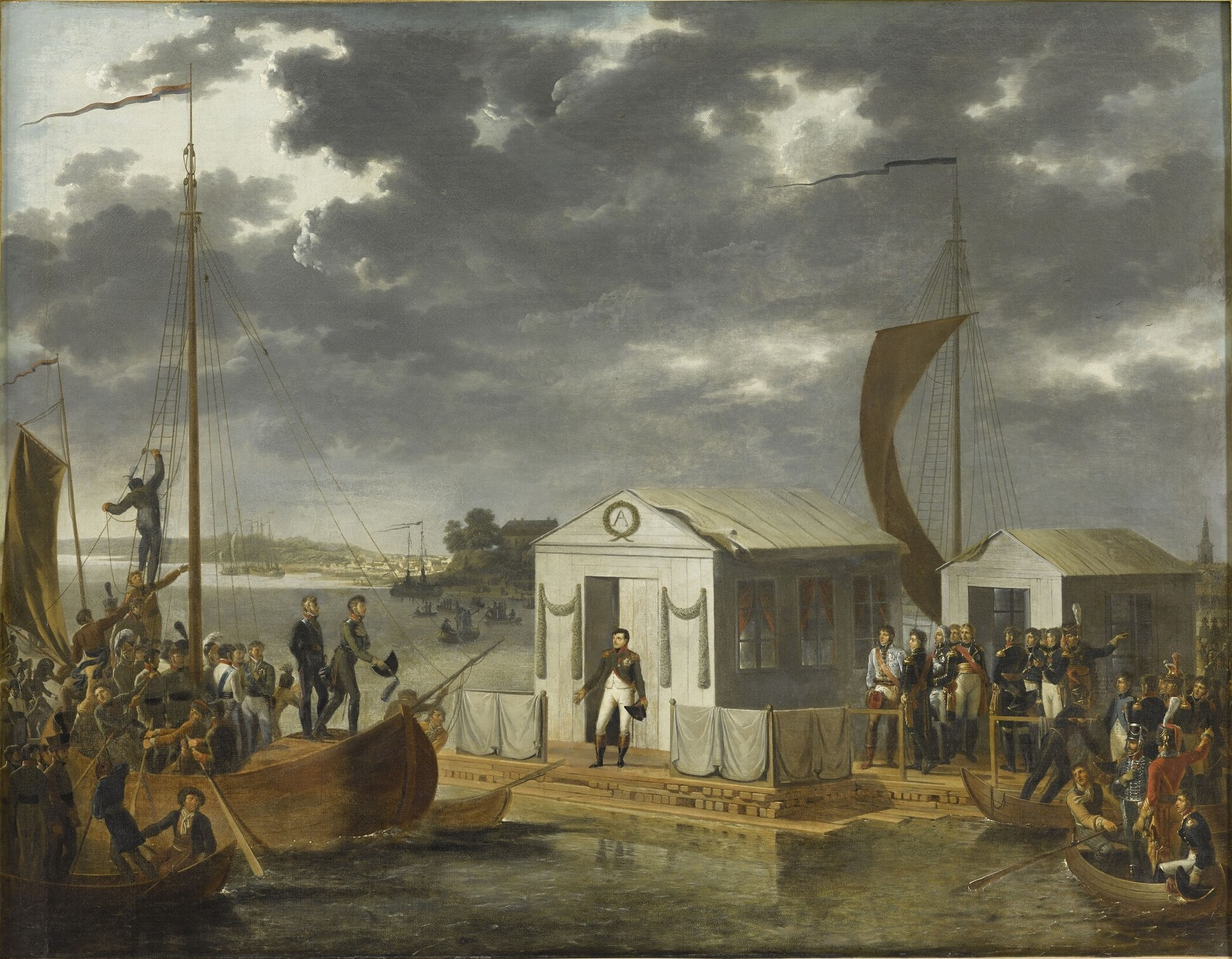
The Treaties of Tilsit: Napoleon meeting with Alexander I of Russia on a raft in the middle of the Neman River, 7 July 1807.

On 14 June Napoleon obtained an overwhelming victory over the Russians at the Battle of Friedland, inflicting casualties of up to 30% of the Russian army. The scale of their defeat convinced the Russians to make peace with the French. The two emperors began peace negotiations on 25 June at the town of Tilsit during a meeting on a raft floating in the middle of the River Niemen which separated the French and Russian troops and their respective spheres of influence. Napoleon offered Alexander relatively lenient terms—demanding that Russia join the Continental System, withdraw its forces from Wallachia and Moldavia, and hand over the Ionian Islands to France. In contrast, Prussia was treated harshly. It lost half its territory and population and underwent a two-year occupation costing it about 1.4 billion francs. From former Prussian territory, Napoleon created the Kingdom of Westphalia, ruled by his young brother Jérôme, and the Duchy of Warsaw. Prussia's humiliating treatment at Tilsit caused lasting resentment against France in that country. The treaty was also unpopular in Russia, putting pressure on Alexander to end the alliance with France. Nevertheless, the Treaties of Tilsit gave Napoleon a respite from war and allowed him to return to France, which he had not seen in over 300 days.

==== Peninsular War and Erfurt ====
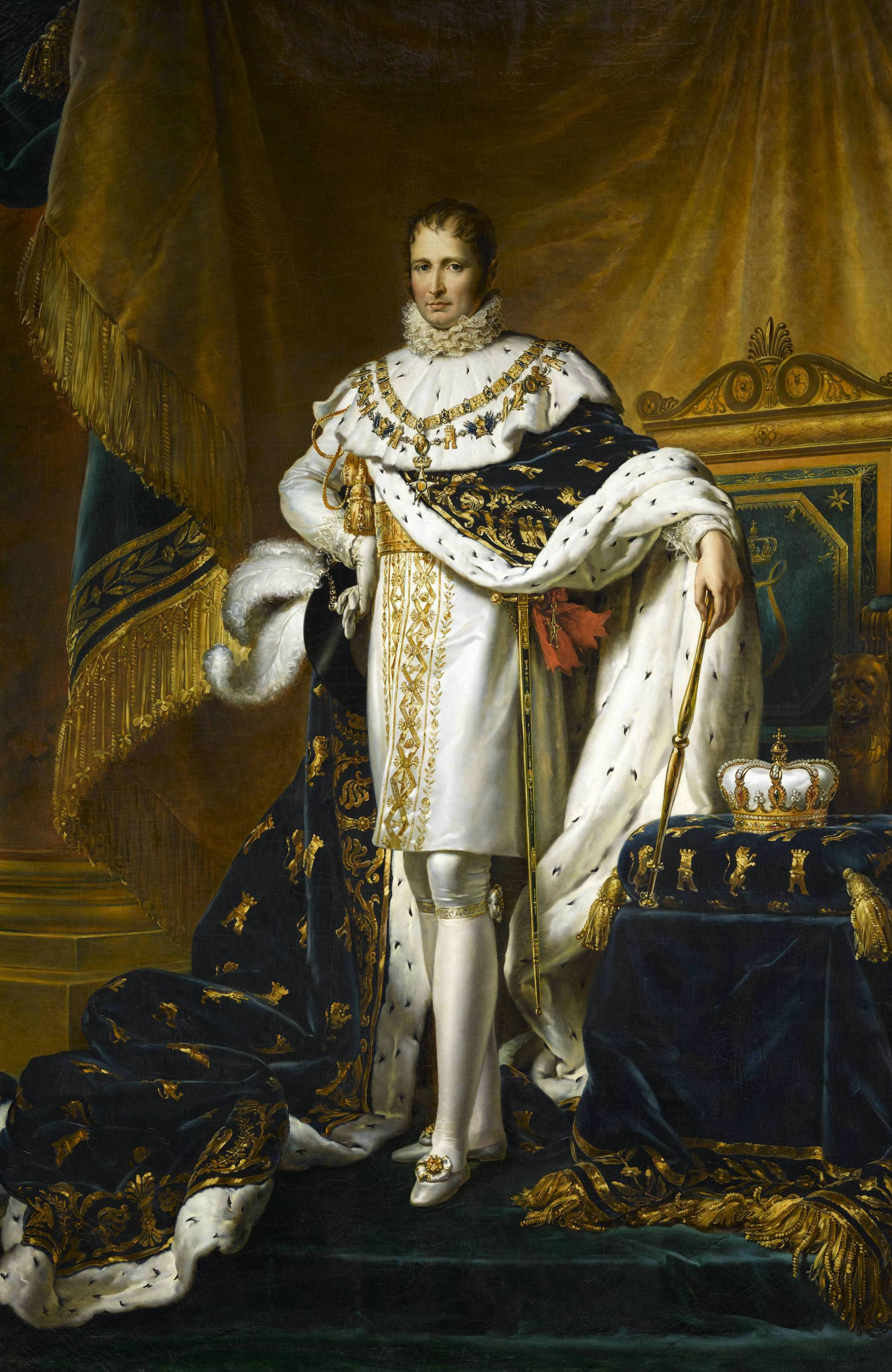
Portrait of Joseph Bonaparte by François Gérard, 1808, depicting Napoleon's elder brother as King of Spain

After Tilsit, Napoleon turned his attention to Portugal, which was reluctant to strictly enforce the blockade against its traditional ally Britain. On 17 October 1807, 24,000 French troops under General Jean-Andoche Junot crossed the Pyrenees with Spanish consent and headed towards Portugal to enforce the blockade. Junot occupied Lisbon in November; the Portuguese royal family had already fled to Brazil with the Portuguese fleet.

In March 1808 a palace coup led to the abdication of the Spanish king, Carlos IV, in favour of his son Fernando VII. The following month, Napoleon summoned Carlos and Fernando to Bayonne, where in May he forced them both to relinquish their claims to the Spanish throne. Napoleon then made his brother Joseph King of Spain. By then, there were 120,000 French troops garrisoned in the peninsula and widespread Spanish opposition to the occupation and the overthrow of the Spanish Bourbons. On 2 May an uprising against the French broke out in Madrid and spread throughout Spain in the following weeks. In the face of brutal French repression, the uprising developed into a sustained conflict. Joseph travelled to Madrid where he was proclaimed King of Spain on 24 July. However, following news of a French defeat by regular Spanish forces at the Battle of Bailén, Joseph fled Madrid several days later. The following month, a British force landed in Portugal and on 21 August they defeated the French at the Battle of Vimiero. Under the Convention of Cintra, the French evacuated Portugal.

The defeats at Bailén and Vimiero convinced Napoleon that he had to take command of the Iberian campaign. Before leaving for Spain, he attempted to strengthen the alliance with Russia and obtain a commitment from Alexander that Russia would declare war on Austria if she attacked France. At the Congress of Erfurt in October 1808, Napoleon and Alexander reached an agreement that recognized the Russian conquest of Finland and called upon Britain to cease its war against France. However, Alexander failed to provide a firm commitment to make war with Austria.

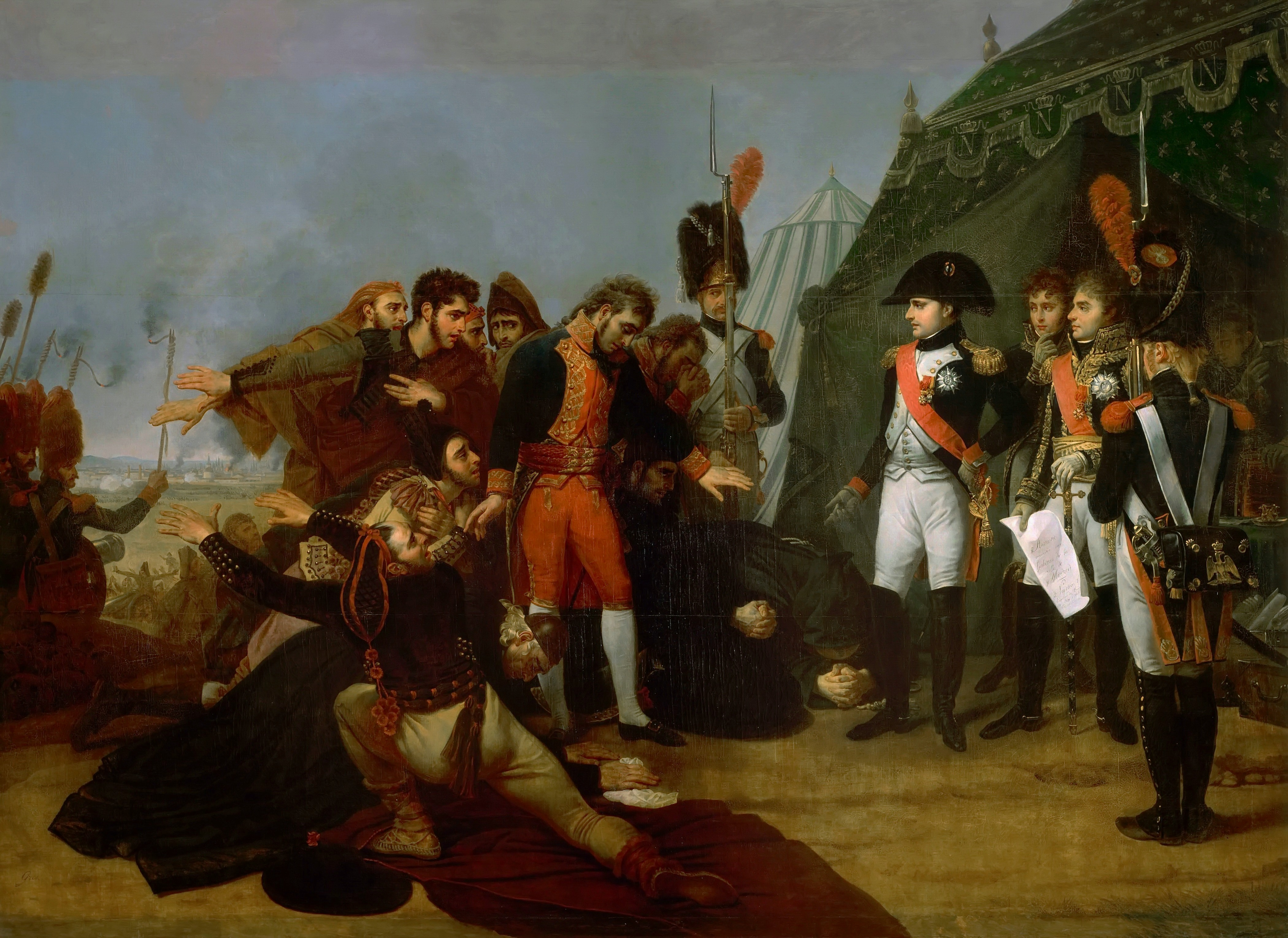
Napoleon Accepting the Surrender of Madrid, 4 December 1808

On 6 November Napoleon was in Vitoria and took command of 240,000 French-led troops. After a series of victories over Anglo-Spanish forces, they retook Madrid on 4 December. Napoleon then pursued a retreating British army which was eventually evacuated at Corunna in January 1809. He left for France on 17 January, leaving Joseph in command. Napoleon never returned to Spain after the 1808 campaign. In April, the British sent another army to the peninsula under Arthur Wellesley, the future Duke of Wellington. British, Portuguese and Spanish troops engaged the French in a protracted series of conflicts, while a brutal guerrilla war engulfed much of the Spanish countryside, a conflict in which atrocities were committed by both sides. Napoleon later called the Peninsular campaign, "the unlucky war [that] ruined me." It tied up some 300,000 French-led troops from 1808 to 1812. By 1814, the French had been driven from the peninsula, with over 150,000 casualties in the campaign.

==== War of the Fifth Coalition ====
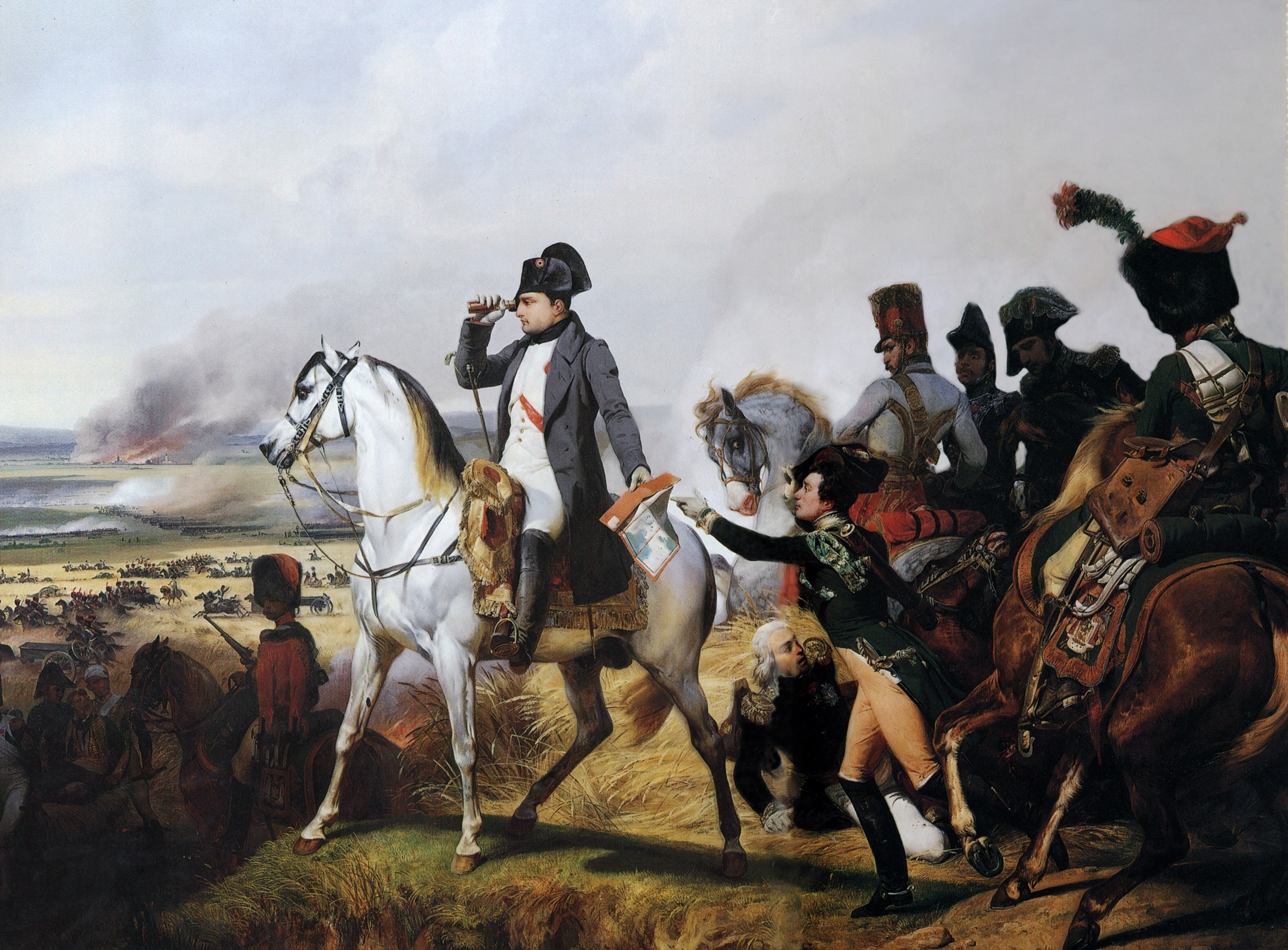
The Battle of Wagram by Horace Vernet, 1836

The overthrow of the Spanish Bourbons caused alarm in Austria over Napoleon's ambitions while France's military difficulties in the Peninsular encouraged Austria to go to war. In the early morning of 10 April 1809, the Austrian army crossed the Inn River and invaded Bavaria. The Austrian advance was disorganized, and they were unable to defeat the Bavarian army before the French could concentrate their forces. Napoleon arrived from Paris on 17 April to lead the French campaign. In the following Battle of Eckmühl he was slightly wounded in the heel, but the Austrians were forced to retreat across the Danube. The French occupied Vienna on 13 May, but most of the population had fled and the retreating army had destroyed all four bridges across the river.

On 21 May, the French attempted to cross the Danube, precipitating the Battle of Aspern-Essling. Both sides inflicted about 23,000 casualties on each other, and the French were forced back. The battle was reported in European capitals as a defeat for Napoleon and damaged his aura of invincibility. After six weeks of preparations, Napoleon made another attempt at crossing the Danube. In the ensuing Battle of Wagram (5–6 July) the Austrians were forced to retreat, but the French and Austrians each suffered losses of 37,000 to 39,000 killed, wounded or captured. The French caught up with the retreating Austrians at the Battle of Znaim on 10 July, and the latter signed an armistice on 12 July. In August, a British force landed in Holland but lost 4,000 men, mainly to illness, before withdrawing in December.

The Treaty of Schönbrunn in October 1809 was harsh for Austria which lost substantial territory and over three million subjects. France received Carinthia, Carniola, and the Adriatic ports of Trieste and Fiume (Rijeka); the part of Poland annexed by Austria in the third partition in 1795, known at the time as West Galicia, was given to the Polish-ruled Duchy of Warsaw; and the territory of the former Archbishopric of Salzburg went to Bavaria. Austria was required to pay an indemnity of 200 million francs, and its army was reduced to 150,000 men.

==== Consolidation of the empire ====
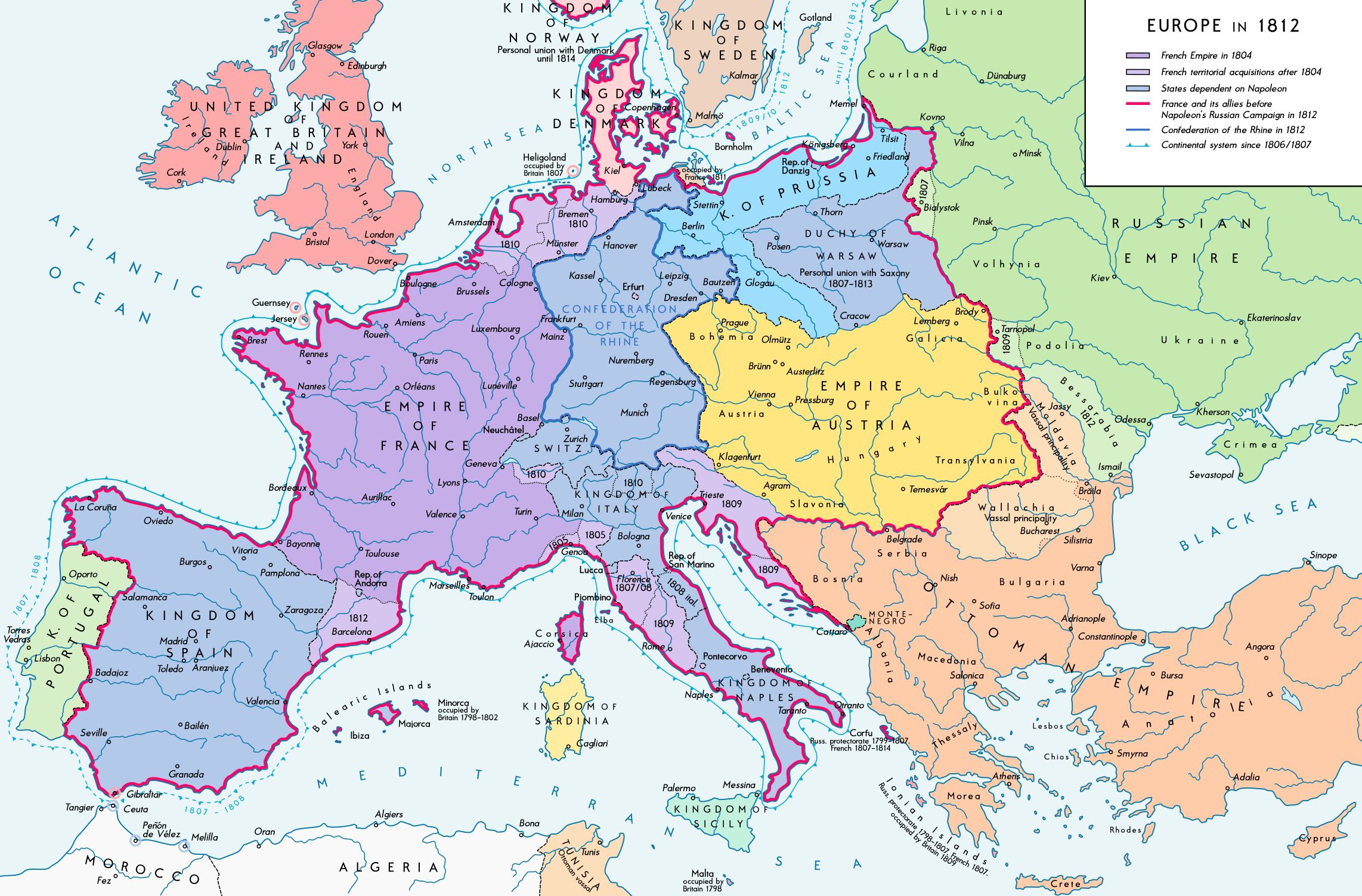
The French Empire at its greatest extent in 1812: French Empire French satellite states

Napoleon's union with Joséphine had not produced a child, and he decided to secure the dynasty and strengthen its position in Europe by a strategic marriage into one of Europe's major royal houses. In November 1809, he announced his decision to divorce Joséphine, and the marriage was annulled in January 1810. Napoleon had already commenced negotiations for the marriage of Tsar Alexander's sister Anna, but the tsar responded that she was too young. Napoleon then turned to Austria, and a marriage to the Austrian emperor's daughter, Marie Louise, was quickly agreed. The marriage was formalized in a civil ceremony on 1 April and a religious service at the Louvre on the following day. The marriage to Marie Louise was widely seen as a shift in French policy towards stronger ties with Austria and away from the already strained relationship with Russia. On 20 March 1811, Marie Louise gave birth to the heir apparent, François Charles Joseph Napoleon, King of Rome.

With the annexation of the Papal States (May 1809, February 1810), Holland (July 1810) and the northern coastal regions of Westphalia (August 1810), mainland France further increased its territory. Napoleon now ruled about 40% of the European population either directly or indirectly through his satellite kingdoms.

==== Invasion of Russia ====
Tsar Alexander saw the creation of the Grand Duchy of Warsaw, Napoleon's marriage alliance with Austria, and the election of the French Marshal Jean-Baptiste Jules Bernadotte as Crown Prince of Sweden as attempts to contain Russia. In December 1810 Napoleon annexed the Duchy of Oldenburg, which Alexander considered an insult as his uncle was the duke. Alexander responded by allowing neutral shipping into Russian ports and banning most French imports. Russia feared that Napoleon intended to restore the Kingdom of Poland while Napoleon suspected Russia of seeking an alliance with Britain against France.

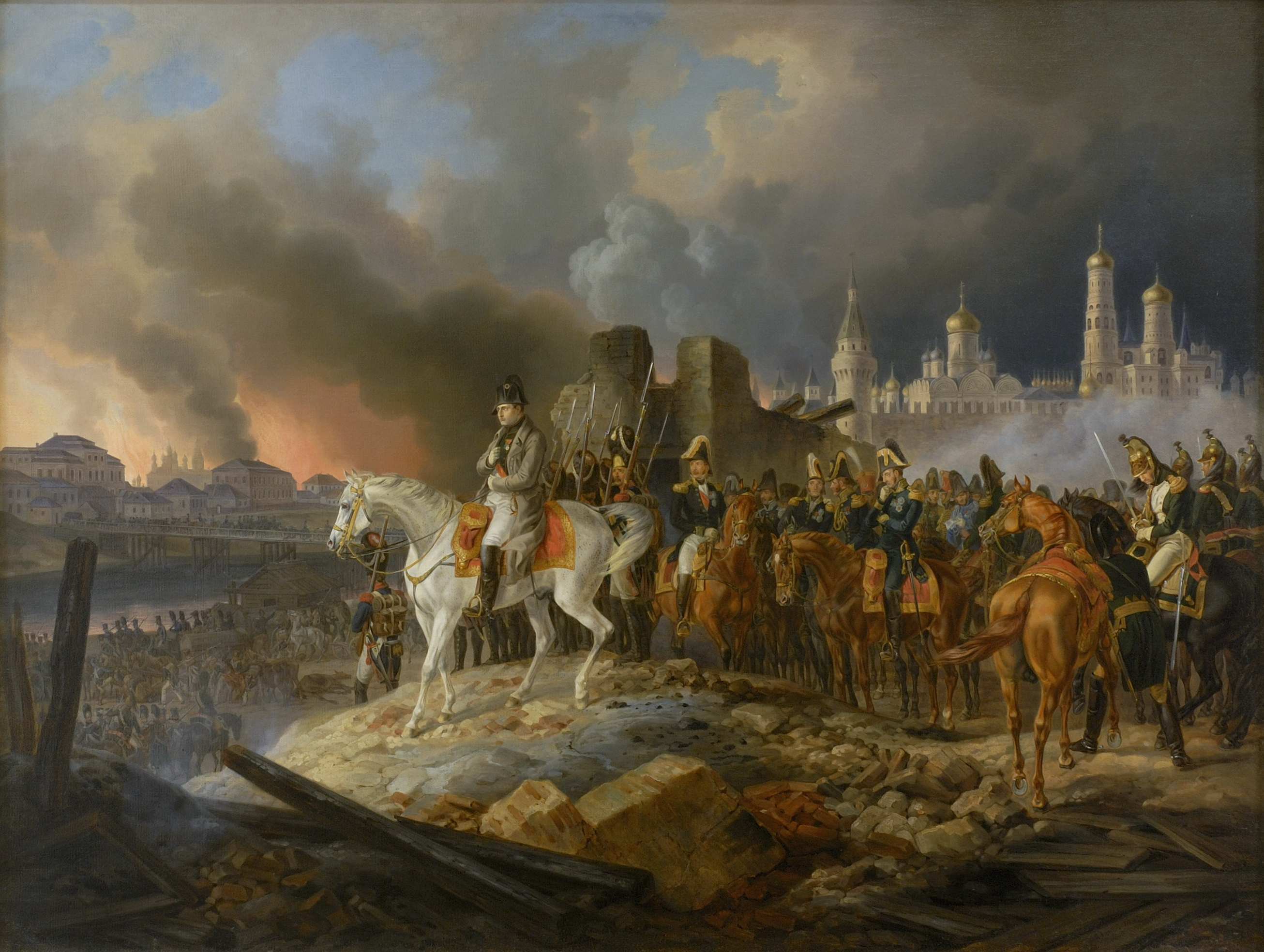
Napoleon Watching the Fire of Moscow in September 1812, by Adam Albrecht (1841)

In late 1811 Napoleon began planning an invasion of Russia. A Franco-Prussian alliance signed in February 1812 forced Prussia to provide 20,000 troops for the invasion, and in March Austria agreed to provide 30,000 men. Napoleon's multinational Grande Armée comprised around 450,000 frontline troops of which about a third were native French speakers. Napoleon called the invasion the "Second Polish War," but he refused to guarantee an independent Poland for fear of alienating his Austrian and Prussian allies.

On 24 June Napoleon's troops began crossing the Nieman river into Russian Lithuania with the aim of luring the Russians into one or two decisive battles. The Russians retreated 320 kilometres east to the Dvina river and implemented a scorched earth policy, making it increasingly difficult for the French to forage food for themselves and their horses. On 18 August, Napoleon captured Smolensk with the loss of 9,000 of his men, but the Russians were able to withdraw in good order.

The Russians, commanded by Field Marshall Mikhail Kutuzov, made a stand at Borodino, outside Moscow, on 7 September. The battle resulted in 44,000 Russian and 35,000 French dead, wounded or captured, in one of the bloodiest days of battle in Europe up to that time. The Russians withdrew overnight, and Napoleon later stated, "The most terrible of all my battles was the one before Moscow. The French showed themselves worthy of victory, and the Russians worthy of being invincible".

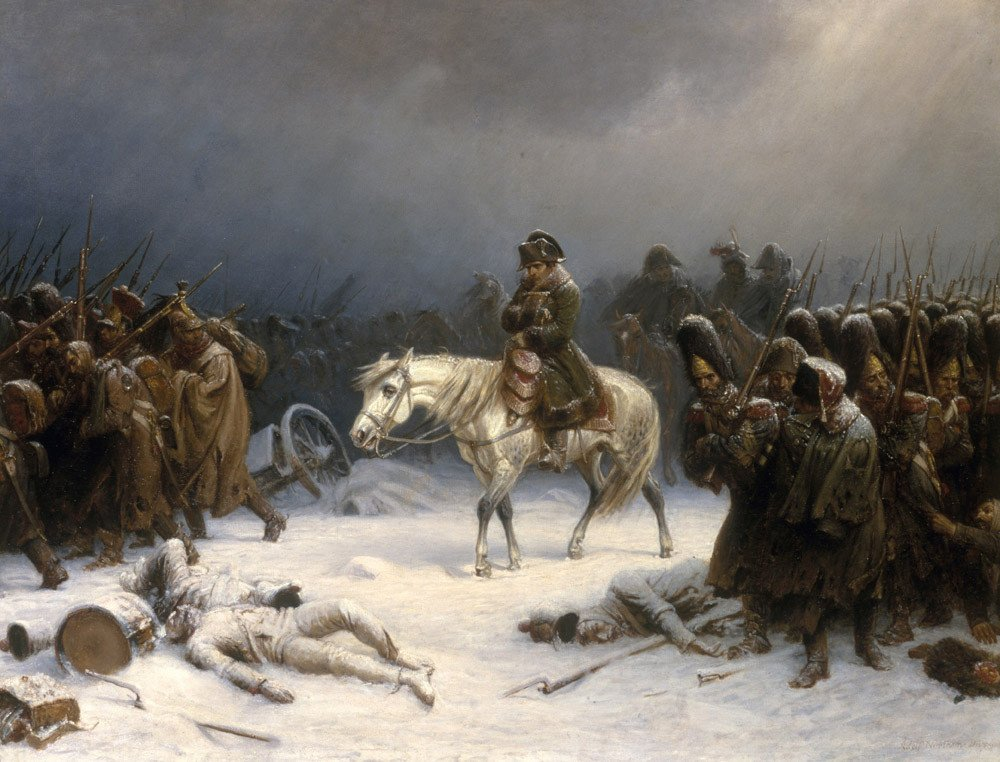
Napoleon's Withdrawal from Russia, by Adolph Northen

The Russians retreated to Tarutino, and Napoleon entered Moscow on 14 September. The following evening, the city was set on fire on the orders of Governor Feodor Rostopchin. Alexander, in St Petersburg, refused to negotiate a peace, and after six weeks Napoleon's army evacuated Moscow. After capturing Maloyaroslavets with the loss of 4,000 to 10,000 men, Napoleon retreated towards Smolensk. The French were attacked by Cossacks and peasants and suffered from the intense cold, disease and lack of food and water. Around 40,000 to 50,000 troops reached Smolensk on 9 November, a loss of about 60,000 in three weeks. Napoleon also heard that an attempted coup by General Claude François de Malet in Paris had only narrowly failed.

From Smolensk, Napoleon's army headed for Vilnius, where there was a French garrison of 20,000. In late November, under attack from all sides by Russian forces, the grande armée managed to cross the Berezina river on pontoon bridges in temperatures reaching −40 °C (−40 °F). On 5 December, shortly before arriving in Vilnius, Napoleon left his disintegrating army for Paris. In the following weeks, the remnants of the grande armée, about 75,000 troops, crossed the Nieman into allied territory. Russian military losses in the campaign were up to 300,000, and total military deaths from both sides were up to one million.

==== War of the Sixth Coalition ====
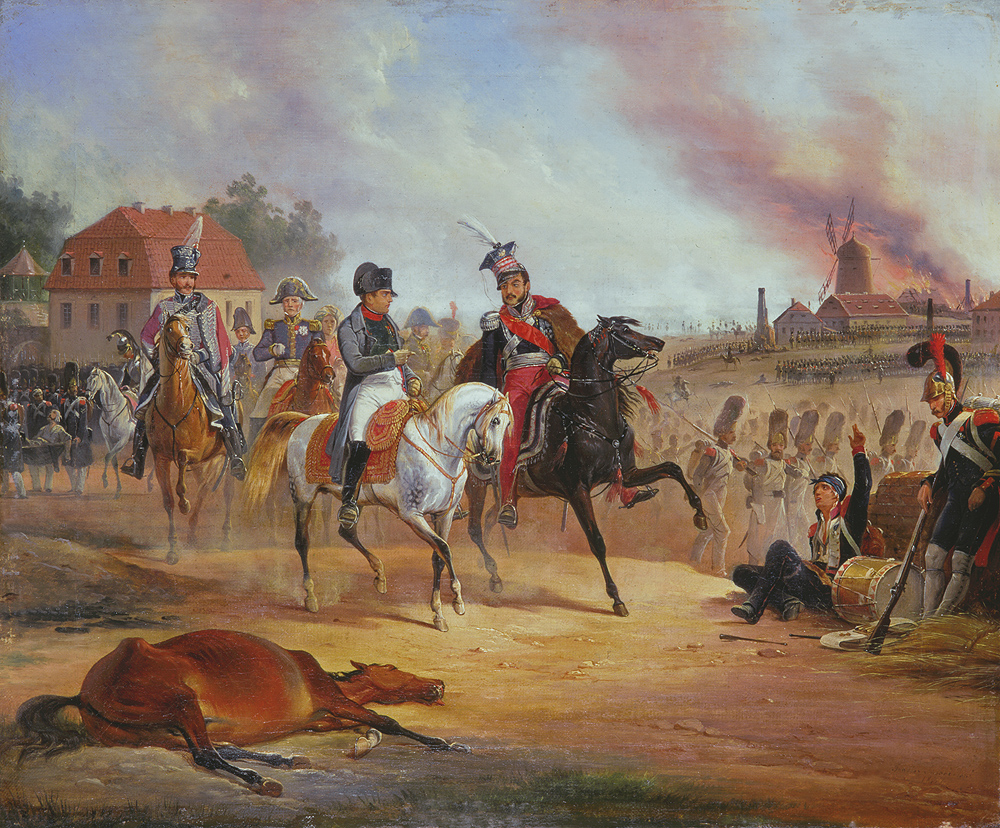
Napoleon and Prince Józef Poniatowski at Leipzig, painting by January Suchodolski

The French, pursued by the Russians, withdrew from most of Poland and Prussia over the winter of 1812–13 while both sides rebuilt their forces. Sweden and Prussia declared war on France in March 1813. In April Napoleon assumed command of an army of 200,000 troops and defeated the coalition at the battles of Lützen and Bautzen. Britain formally joined the coalition in June followed by Austria in August, but the allies were again defeated in the Battle of Dresden in August. The coalition, however, had a growing advantage in infantry, cavalry, reserves and armaments. In the largest battle of the Napoleonic wars, the coalition was victorious at the Battle of Leipzig (19 October). Although coalition casualties were 54,000 men, the French lost 38,000 killed or wounded and 15,000 taken prisoner. Up to 50,000 more were lost to death, illness and desertion during the French retreat to the Rhine.

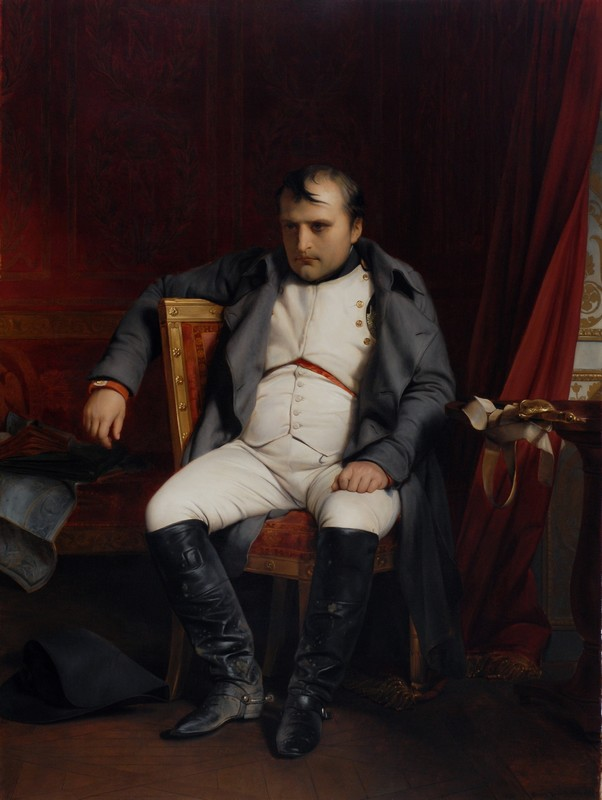
Napoleon after his abdication in Fontainebleau, 4 April 1814, by Paul Delaroche

The Frankfurt proposals were peace terms offered by the coalition in November 1813 under which Napoleon would remain emperor but France would be reduced to its "natural frontiers." That meant that France would retain control of Belgium, Savoy and the west bank of the Rhine, while withdrawing from Spain, Holland, Italy and Germany. Napoleon did not accept the terms, and the allies crossed the Rhine into French territory on 1 January 1814. Wellington's British forces had already crossed the Pyrenees into south-western France. In north-eastern France, Napoleon led about 70,000 troops against a coalition army of 200,000. After a defeat at the Battle of La Rothière, the French won a series of victories in February which induced the coalition to offer peace on the basis of France's 1791 frontiers. Napoleon, however, decided to fight on.

After a series of battles in March, the allies forced Napoleon to retreat at the Battle of Arcis-sur-Aube (20–21 March). The coalition then moved towards Paris, whose defence was under the command of Joseph Bonaparte. On 29 March, a coalition army of 200,000 began their attack on the Belleville and Montmartre heights. Empress Marie Louise fled Paris that evening with her son, the king of Rome. With an army of only 38,000 to defend the capital, Joseph authorized the French marshal Auguste de Marmont to capitulate on 31 March. The following day, the allies accepted Charles Maurice de Talleyrand-Périgord as head of a provisional government. On 2 April the French Senate passed the Acte de déchéance de l'Empereur, which declared Napoleon deposed. Meanwhile, Napoleon was in Fontainebleau with an army of 40,000 to 60,000. He contemplated a march on Paris, but on 4 April his senior commanders persuaded him to abdicate in favour of his son, with Marie Louise as regent. (Note: There were actually three versions of the act written on 4 April 1814. The final signed version explicitly refers to "Napoleon II" as his successor.) Tsar Alexander, however, demanded an unconditional abdication, and Napoleon reluctantly complied on 6 April.

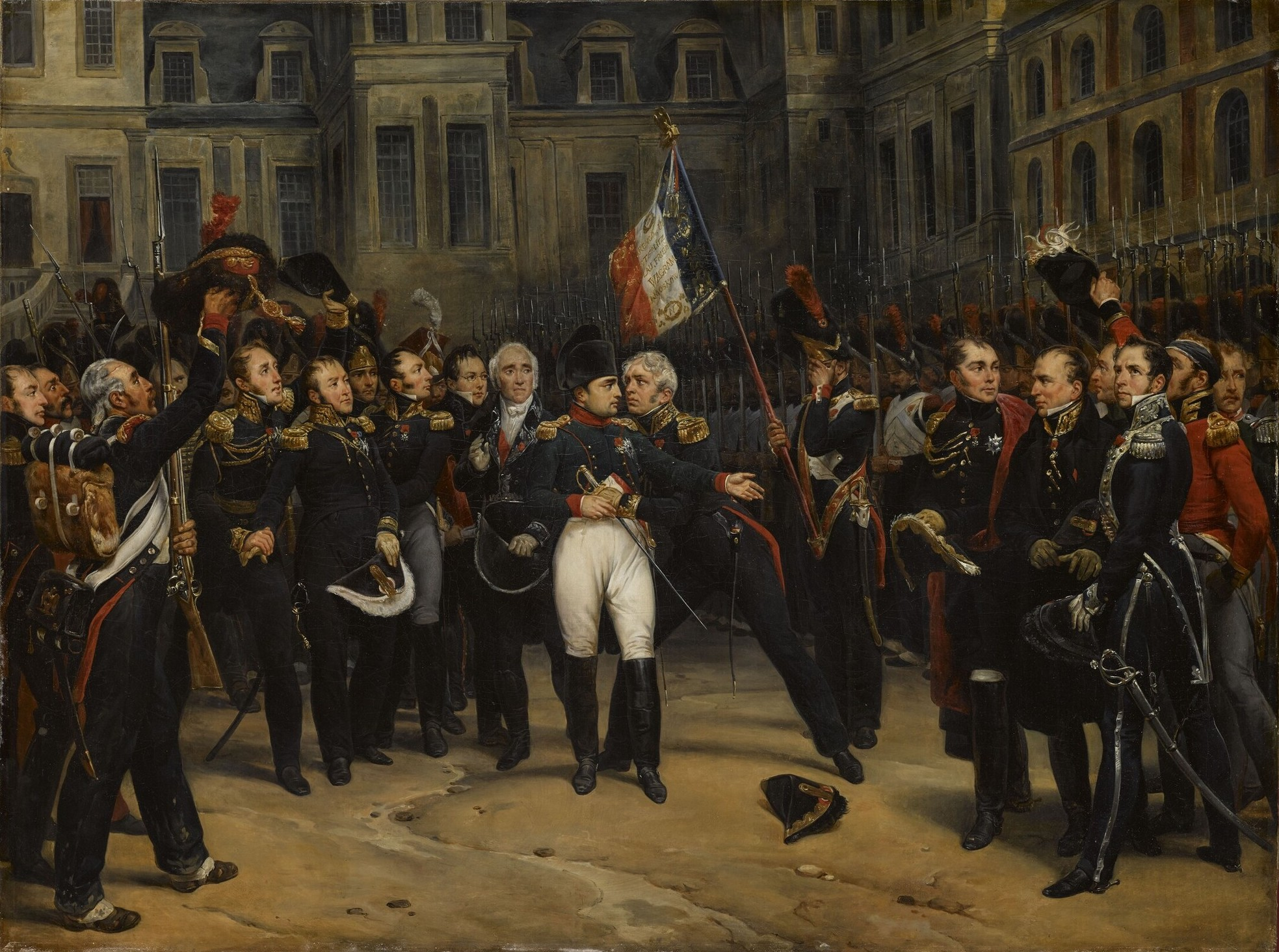
Napoleon's farewell to his Imperial Guard, 20 April 1814, by Antoine-Alphonse Montfort

In his farewell address to the soldiers of the Old Guard on 20 April, Napoleon said:

"Soldiers of my Old Guard, I have come to bid you farewell. For twenty years you have accompanied me faithfully on the paths of honor and glory. ...With men like you, our cause was [not] lost, but the war would have dragged on interminably, and it would have been a civil war. ... So I am sacrificing our interests to those of our country. ...Do not lament my fate; if I have agreed to live on, it is to serve our glory. I wish to write the history of the great deeds we have done together. Farewell, my children!"

=== Exile to Elba ===
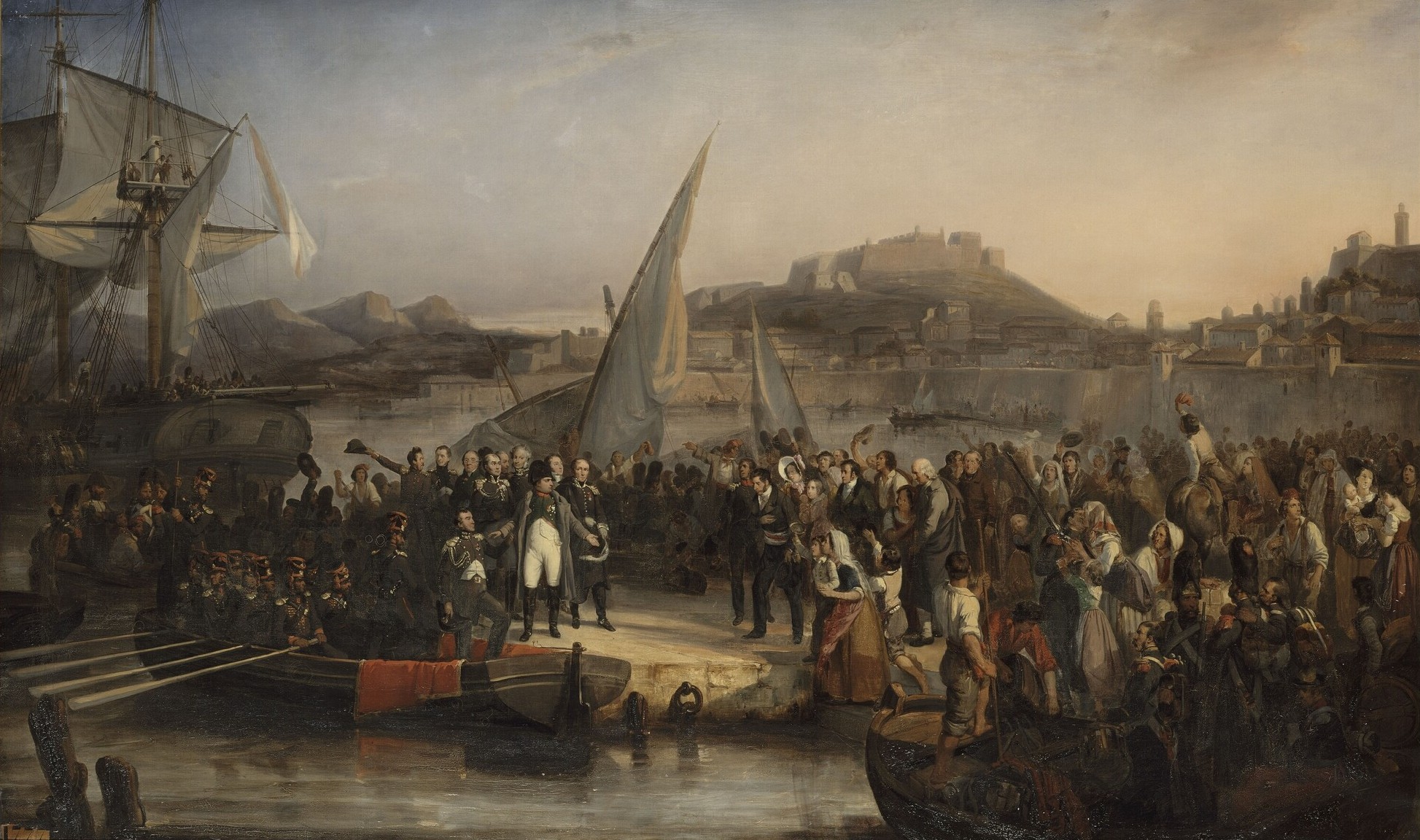
Napoleon's Departure from Elba by Joseph Beaume, 1836

With the Treaty of Fontainebleau of 11 April 1814, the allies exiled Napoleon to Elba, an island of 12,000 inhabitants in the Mediterranean, 10 km (6 mi) off the Tuscan coast, where they made him sovereign. The following night, Napoleon attempted suicide with poison he had carried after nearly being captured by the Russians during the retreat from Moscow. Its potency had weakened with age, however, and he survived to be exiled, while his wife and son took refuge in Austria. He was conveyed to the island on HMS Undaunted and disembarked at Portoferraio on 4 May. In the first few months on Elba, he drew up plans for administrative reforms, road and building works, and improvements to the island's mines and agriculture, but results were limited by lack of funds. When Napoleon learned that Joséphine had died in France on 29 May, he was distraught and locked himself in his room for two days.

Napoleon understood that French King Louis XVIII was unpopular. Realizing that his wife and son would not be joining him in exile, cut off from the allowance guaranteed to him by the Treaty of Fontainebleau, and aware of rumours he was about to be banished to a remote island in the Atlantic Ocean, Napoleon escaped from Elba in the brig Inconstant on 26 February 1815 with about 1,000 men and a flotilla of seven vessels.

=== Hundred Days ===
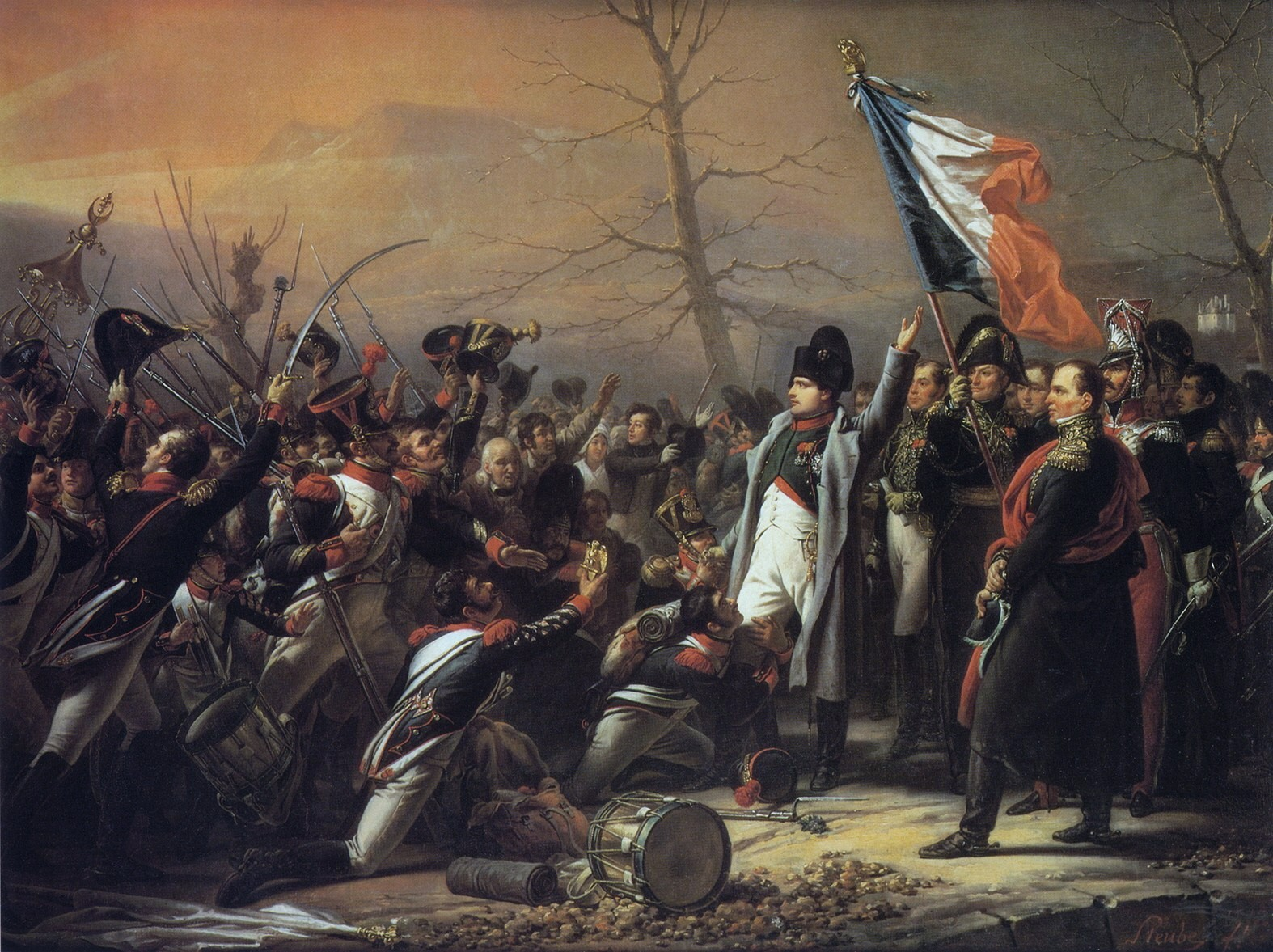
Napoleon's Return from Elba, by Charles de Steuben, 1818

On 1 March 1815 Napoleon and his followers landed on the French mainland at Golfe-Juan and headed for Grenoble through the foothills of the Alps, taking the route now known as Route Napoléon. The 5th Regiment intercepted him just south of Grenoble on 7 March. Napoleon approached the battalion alone and called to them, "Here I am. Kill your Emperor, if you wish!" The soldiers responded with, "Vive l'empereur!" and joined Napoleon's men. On 14 March Marshall of the Empire Michel Ney—who weeks earlier had boasted that he would bring Napoleon to Paris in an iron cage—joined Napoleon along with an army of 6,000.

On 13 March the powers at the Congress of Vienna declared Napoleon an outlaw. Four days later, Great Britain, Russia, Austria, and Prussia each pledged to put 150,000 men into the field to end his rule. Louis XVIII, however, fled Paris for Belgium in the early hours of 20 March after realizing that he did not have enough reliable troops to oppose Napoleon. Napoleon entered Paris that evening. Napoleon appointed a government and introduced constitutional changes which were approved by plebiscite in May. A Chamber of Representatives was also indirectly elected that month on a highly restrictive property franchise. Napoleon's priority was to raise an army to face the coalition, but the law did not allow conscription and he was only able to raise about 300,000 men, mostly raw recruits and national guards.

On 12 June Napoleon led about 124,000 men, known as the Army of the North, into Belgium, aiming to drive a wedge between Wellington's army of 112,000 British, German and Dutch troops and Gebhard Leberecht von Blücher's force of 130,000 Prussians and Saxons. After engagements at the Battle of Ligny and Battle of Quatre Bras, Napoleon confronted Wellington at the Battle of Waterloo on 18 June. Wellington's army withstood repeated attacks by the French until, late in the afternoon, Blücher's Prussians arrived in force on Napoleon's right flank. The coalition forces broke through Napoleon's lines, inflicting a devastating defeat.

Napoleon returned to Paris and found that the legislature had turned against him. Realizing that his position was untenable, he abdicated on 22 June in favour of his son. He left Paris three days later and settled at Joséphine's former palace in Château de Malmaison. By 28 June, the Prussian army was at Senlis, just north of Paris. When Napoleon heard that Prussian troops had orders to capture him dead or alive, he fled to Rochefort, Charente-Maritime, considering an escape to the United States. However, when he found that British ships were blockading the port, he surrendered to Frederick Lewis Maitland on HMS Bellerophon on 15 July 1815.

== Exile on Saint Helena ==
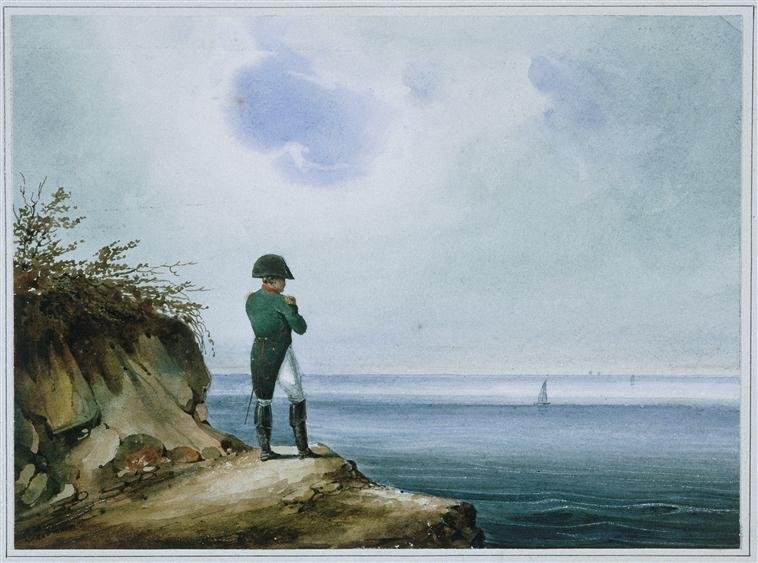
Napoleon on Saint Helena, watercolour by Franz Josef Sandmann, c. 1820

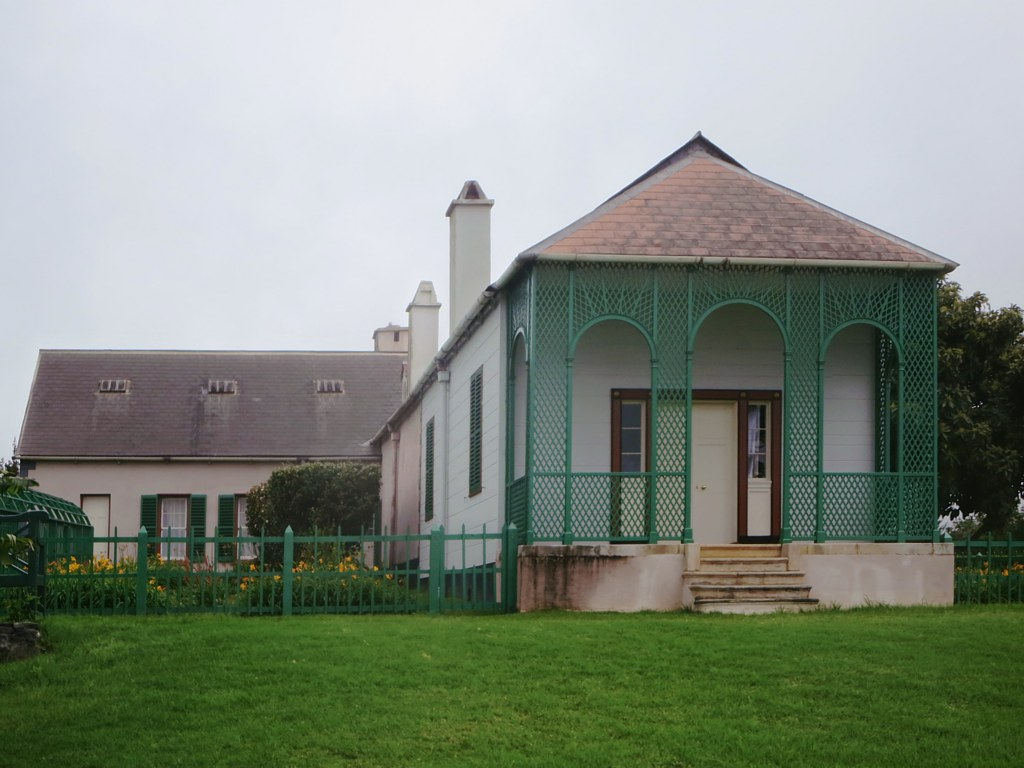
Longwood House, Saint Helena, site of Napoleon's captivity

Napoleon was held in British custody and transferred to the island of Saint Helena in the Atlantic Ocean, 1,870 km (1,010 nmi) from the west coast of Africa. Napoleon and 27 followers arrived at Jamestown in October 1815 on board HMS Northumberland. The prisoner was guarded by a garrison of 2,100 soldiers while a squadron of 10 ships continuously patrolled the waters to prevent escape. In the following years, there were rumours of escape plots, but no serious attempts were ever made.

Napoleon stayed for two months at a pavilion in Briars before he was moved to Longwood House, a 40-room wooden bungalow. The location and interior of the house were damp, windswept, rat-infested and unhealthy. The Times published articles insinuating the British government was trying to hasten his death. Napoleon often complained of his living conditions in letters to the island's governor Hudson Lowe while his attendants complained of "colds, catarrhs, damp floors and poor provisions".

Napoleon insisted on imperial formality. When he held a dinner party, men were expected to wear military dress and "women [appeared] in evening gowns and gems. It was an explicit denial of the circumstances of his captivity". He formally received visitors, read, and dictated his memoirs and commentaries on military campaigns. He studied English under Emmanuel, comte de Las Cases, for a few months but gave up as he was poor at languages.

Napoleon circulated reports of poor treatment in the hope that public opinion would force the allies to revoke his exile on Saint Helena. Under instructions from the government, Lowe cut Napoleon's expenditure, refused to recognize him as a former emperor, and made his supporters sign a guarantee they would stay with him indefinitely. Accounts of Napoleon's treatment led in March 1817 to a debate in the British Parliament where Henry Vassall-Fox, 3rd Baron Holland, made a call for a public inquiry.

In mid-1817, Napoleon's health worsened. His physician, Barry O'Meara, diagnosed chronic hepatitis and warned Lowe that Napoleon could die from the poor climate and lack of exercise. Lowe thought O'Meara was exaggerating and dismissed him in July 1818. In November 1818, the allies announced that Napoleon would remain a prisoner on Saint Helena for life. When he learnt the news, he became depressed and more isolated, spending longer periods in his rooms, which further undermined his health. Much of his entourage left Saint Helena, including Las Cases in December 1816, General Gaspard Gourgaud in March 1818 and Albine de Montholon—who was possibly Napoleon's lover—in July 1819. In September 1819, two priests and the physician François Carlo Antommarchi joined Napoleon's retinue.

=== Death ===
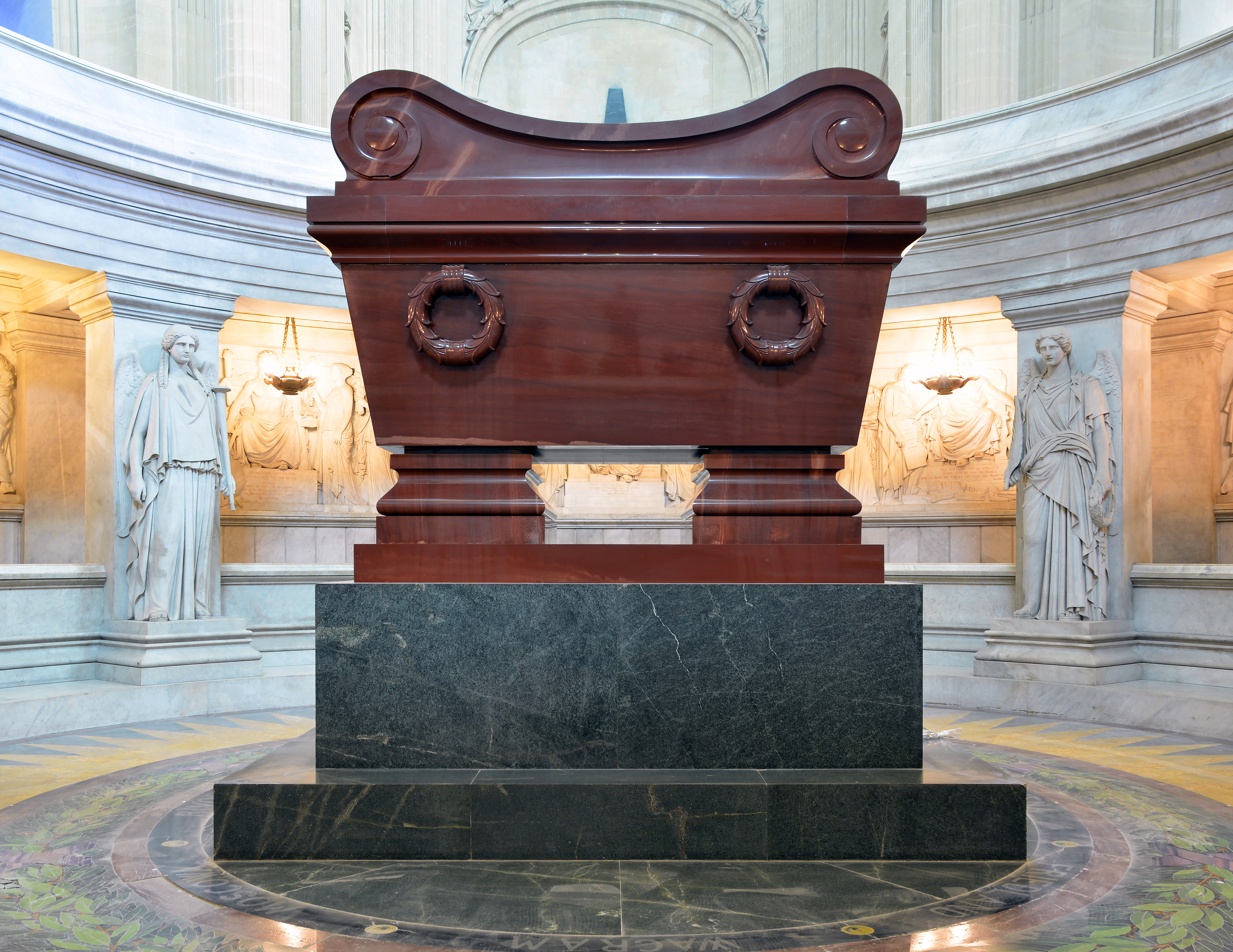
Napoleon's tomb at Les Invalides in Paris

Napoleon's health continued to worsen, and in March 1821 he was confined to bed. In April he wrote two wills declaring that he had been assassinated by the "English oligarchy", that the Bourbons would fall, and that his son would rule France. He left his fortune to 97 legatees and asked to be buried by the Seine. On 3 May he was given the last rites but could not take communion due to his illness. He died on 5 May 1821 at age 51. His last words, variously recorded by those present, were either France, l'armée, tête d'armée, Joséphine ("France, the army, head of the army, Joséphine"), or qui recule...à la tête d'armée ("who retreats... at the head of the army") or "France, my son, the Army."

Antommarchi and the British wrote separate autopsy reports, each concluding that Napoleon had died of internal bleeding caused by stomach cancer, the disease that had killed his father. A later theory, based on high concentrations of arsenic found in samples of Napoleon's hair, held that Napoleon had died of arsenic poisoning. However, subsequent studies also found high concentrations of arsenic in hair samples from Napoleon's childhood and from his son and Joséphine. Arsenic was widely used in medicines and products such as hair creams in the 19th century. A 2021 study by an international team of gastrointestinal pathologists once again concluded that Napoleon died of stomach cancer.

Napoleon was buried with military honours in the Valley of the Geraniums. Napoleon's heart and intestines were removed and sealed inside his coffin. Napoleon's penis was allegedly removed during the autopsy and sold and exhibited. In 1840, the British government gave Louis Philippe I permission to return Napoleon's remains to France. Napoleon's body was exhumed and found to be well preserved as it had been sealed in four coffins (two of metal and two of mahogany) and placed in a masonry tomb. On 15 December 1840, a state funeral was held in Paris with 700,000 to 1,000,000 attendees who lined the route of the funeral procession to the chapel of Les Invalides. The coffin was later placed in the cupola in St Jérôme's Chapel, where it remained until Napoleon's tomb, designed by Louis Visconti, was completed. In 1861, during the reign of Napoleon III, his remains were entombed in a sarcophagus in the crypt under the dome at Les Invalides.

== Religion ==
Reorganisation of the religious geography: France is divided into 59 dioceses and 10 ecclesiastical provinces.

=== Religious beliefs ===
Napoleon was baptized in Ajaccio on 21 July 1771 and raised a Roman Catholic. He began to question his faith at age 13 while at Brienne. Biographers have variously described him from that time as a deist, a follower of Jean-Jacques Rousseau's "natural religion" or a believer in destiny. He consistently expressed his belief in a God or creator.

He understood the power of organized religion in social and political affairs and later sought to use it to support his regime. His attitude to religion is often described as utilitarian. In 1800 he stated, "it was by making myself a Catholic that I won the war in the Vendée, by making myself a Moslem that I established myself in Egypt, by making myself an ultramontane that I turned men's hearts towards me in Italy. If I were to govern a nation of Jews I would rebuild the Temple of Solomon."

Napoleon had a civil marriage with Joséphine in 1796 and, at the pope's insistence, a private religious ceremony with her the day before his coronation as emperor in 1804. This marriage was annulled by tribunals under Napoleon's control in January 1810. In April 1810, Napoleon married Austrian princess Marie Louise in a Catholic ceremony. Napoleon was excommunicated by the pope through the bull Quum memoranda in 1809. His will in 1821 stated, "I die in the Apostolical Roman religion, in the bosom of which I was born, more than fifty years since." Napoleon read the Quran in translation and had an interest in Islam and the Orient. He also defended Muhammad ("a great man") against Voltaire's Mahomet.

=== Concordat ===
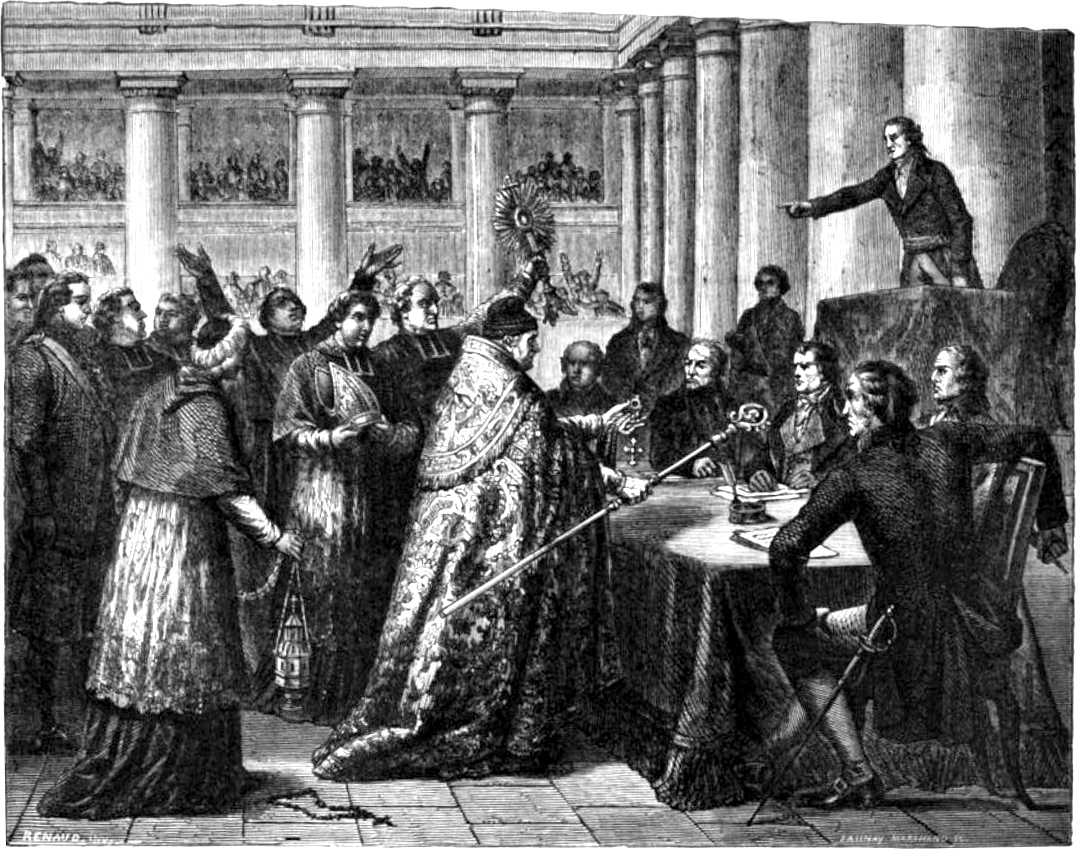
Leaders of the Catholic Church taking the civil oath required by the Concordat of 1801

Seeking national reconciliation between revolutionaries and Catholics, Napoleon and Pope Pius VII agreed to the Concordat of 1801. The agreement recognized the Catholic Church as the majority church of France and in return the Church recognized Napoleon's regime, undercutting much of the ground from royalists. The Concordat confirmed the seizure of Church lands and endowments during the revolution, but reintroduced state salaries for the clergy. The government also controlled the nomination of bishops for investiture by the pope. Bishops and other clergy were required to swear an oath of loyalty to the regime.

When the Concordat was published on 8 April 1802, Napoleon presented another set of laws called the Organic Articles which further increased state control over the French Church. Similar arrangements were made with the Church in territories controlled by Napoleon, especially in Italy and Germany.

=== Arrest of Pope Pius VII ===
Napoleon progressively occupied and annexed the Papal States from 1805. When he annexed Rome in May 1809, the pope excommunicated him the following month. In July, French officials arrested the pope in the Vatican and exiled him to Savona. In 1812 the pontiff was transferred to the Palace of Fontainebleau in France. In January 1813, Napoleon pressured the pope to sign a new "Concordat of Fontainebleau" which was soon repudiated by the pontiff. The pope was not released until 1814.

=== Religious emancipation ===
In February 1795, the National Convention proclaimed religious equality for France's Protestant churches and other religions. In April 1802, Napoleon published laws increasing state control of Calvinist congregations and Lutheran directories, with their pastors to be paid by the state. With Napoleon's military victories, formal religious equality and civil rights for religious minorities spread to the conquered territories and satellite states, although their implementation varied with the local authorities.

Jews in France had been granted full civil rights in September 1791 and religious equality in 1795. The revolutionary and Napoleonic regimes abolished Jewish ghettoes in the territories they conquered. Napoleon wished to assimilate Jews into French society and convened an assembly of Jewish notables in 1806 to that end. In 1807, he summoned a Sanhedrin to adapt the law of Moses to those of the empire. An imperial decree of March 1808 organized Jewish worship into consistories, limited usury and encouraged Jews to adopt a family name, intermarriage, and civil marriage and divorce. Jews, however, were still subject to discrimination in many parts of the empire and satellite states.

== Personality ==
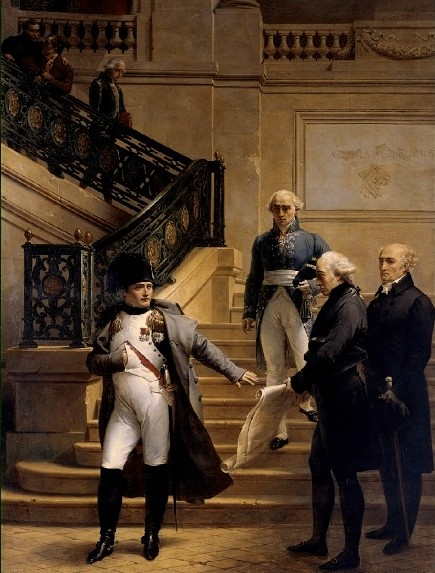
Napoleon visiting the Tribunat

Pieter Geyl wrote in 1947, "It is impossible that two historians, especially two historians living in different periods, should see any historical personality in the same light." There is no dispute that Napoleon was ambitious, although commentators disagree on whether his ambition was mostly for his own power and glory or for the welfare of France. Historians agree that Napoleon was highly intelligent with an excellent memory and was a superior organizer who could work efficiently for long hours. In battle, he could rapidly dictate a series of complex commands to his subordinates, keeping in mind where major units were expected to be at each future point.

He was an inspiring leader who could obtain the best from his soldiers and subordinates. Arthur Wellesley, 1st Duke of Wellington, said his presence on the battlefield was worth 40,000 soldiers. He could charm people when he needed to but could also publicly humiliate them and was known for his rages when his plans were frustrated. The historian Frank McLynn sees him as a misogynist with a cruel streak which he often inflicted on women, children and animals.

There is debate over whether Napoleon was an outsider who never felt at home in France or with other people. Hippolyte Taine said Napoleon saw others only as instruments and was cut off from feelings of admiration, sympathy or pity. Arthur Lévy replied that Napoleon genuinely loved Joséphine and often showed humanity and compassion to his enemies or those who had let him down. He had the normal middle class virtues and understood the common man.

Historians are divided over whether Napoleon was consistently ruthless when his power was threatened or surprisingly indulgent in some cases. Those arguing for a ruthless personality point to episodes such as his violent suppression of revolts in France and conquered territories, his execution of the Duc d'Enghien and plotters against his rule, and his massacre of Turkish prisoners of war in Syria in 1799. Others point to his mild treatment of disloyal subordinates such as Bernadotte, Talleyrand, and Fouché.

Many historians see Napoleon as pragmatic and a realist, at least in the early years of his rule. He was not driven by ideology and promoted capable men irrespective of their political and social background, as long as they were loyal. As an expert in military matters, he valued technical expertise and listened to the advice of experts in other fields. However, there is a consensus that once he dominated Europe he became more intolerant of other views and surrounded himself with "yes men". Towards the end of his reign he lost his realism and ability to compromise.

Some historians talk of Napoleon's dual nature: a rationalist with a strong romantic streak. He took a team of scholars, artists and engineers with him to Egypt in order to scientifically study the country's culture and history, but at the same time was struck by romantic "orientalism". "I was full of dreams," he stated. "I saw myself founding a religion, marching into Asia, riding an elephant, a turban on my head and in my hand a new Koran that I would have composed to suit my need."

Napoleon was superstitious. He believed in omens, numerology, fate and lucky stars, and always asked of his generals: "is he lucky?" Dwyer states that Napoleon's victories at Austerlitz and Jena in 1805–06 left him even more certain of his destiny and invincibility. "I am of the race that founds empires", he once boasted, deeming himself an heir to the Ancient Romans.

Various psychologists have attempted to explain Napoleon's personality. Alfred Adler cites Napoleon to describe an inferiority complex in which short people adopt over-aggressive behaviour to compensate for lack of height; this inspired the term Napoleon complex. Adler, Erich Fromm and Wilhelm Reich ascribe his nervous energy to sexual dysfunction. Harold T. Parker speculated that rivalry with his older brother and bullying when he moved to France led him to develop an inferiority complex which made him domineering.

== Appearance and image ==
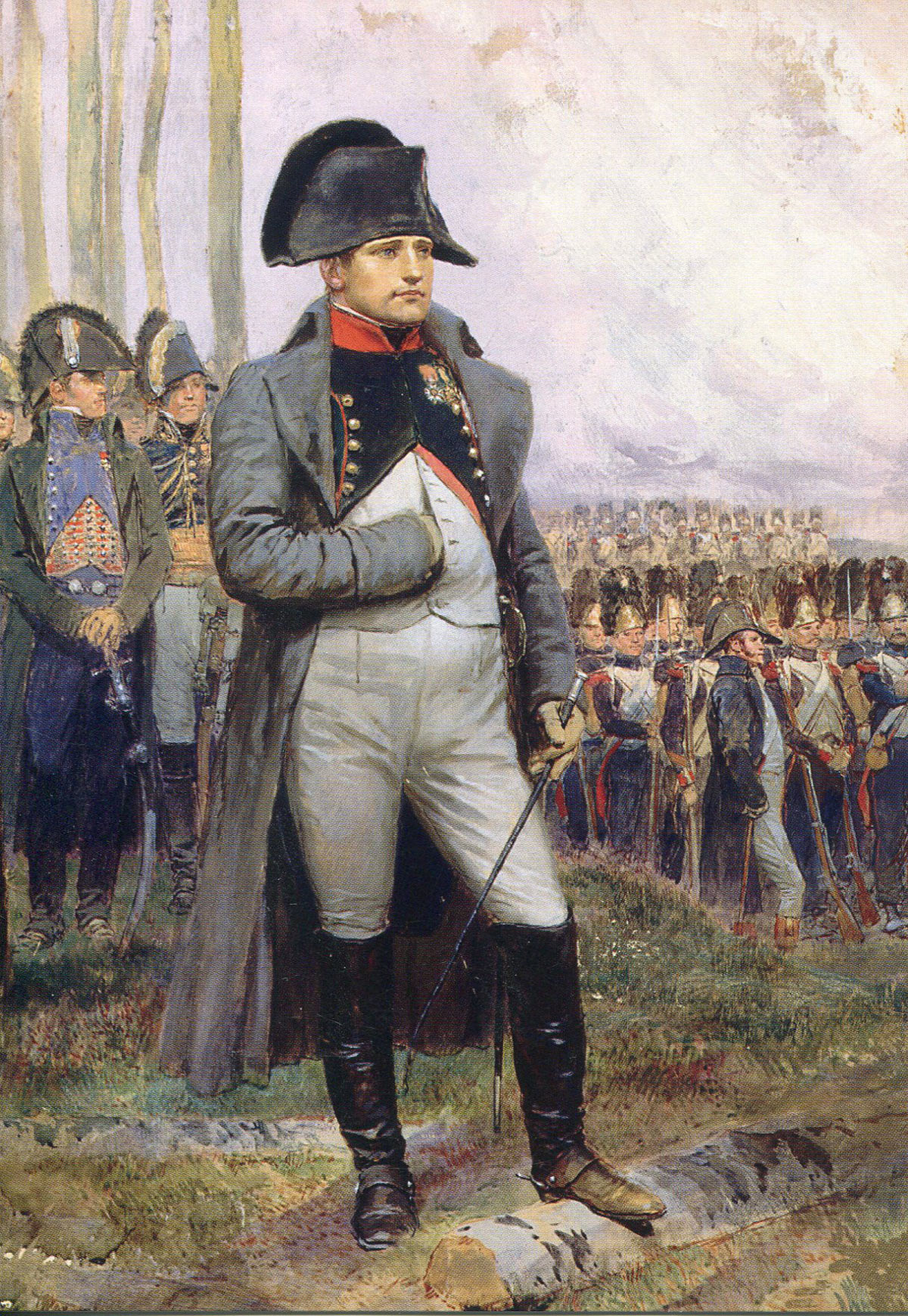
Napoleon is often represented in his green colonel uniform of the Chasseur à Cheval of the Imperial Guard, the regiment that often served as his personal escort, with a large bicorne and a hand-in-waistcoat gesture.

In his youth, Bonaparte was consistently described as small and thin. Johann Ludwig Wurstemberger, who accompanied him in 1797 and 1798, notes "Bonaparte was rather slight and emaciated-looking; his face, too, was very thin, with a dark complexion... his black, unpowdered hair hung down evenly over both shoulders", but that, despite his slight and unkempt appearance, "his looks and expression were earnest and powerful."

The English painter Joseph Farington, who met him in 1802, said Bonaparte's eyes were "lighter, and more of a grey, than I should have expected from his complexion", "his person is below middle size", and "his general aspect was milder than I had before thought it." In his later years Napoleon gained weight and had a sallow complexion. The novelist Paul de Kock, who saw him in 1811, called Napoleon "yellow, obese, and bloated". He is often portrayed wearing a large bicorne hat—sideways—with a hand-in-waistcoat gesture—a reference to the painting produced in 1812 by Jacques-Louis David.

During the Napoleonic Wars, the British press depicted Napoleon as a dangerous tyrant, poised to invade. A nursery rhyme warned children that he ate naughty people; the "bogeyman". He was mocked as a short-tempered small man and was nicknamed "Little Boney in a strong fit". In fact, at about 168 cm (5 ft 6 in), he was of average height.

== Reforms ==
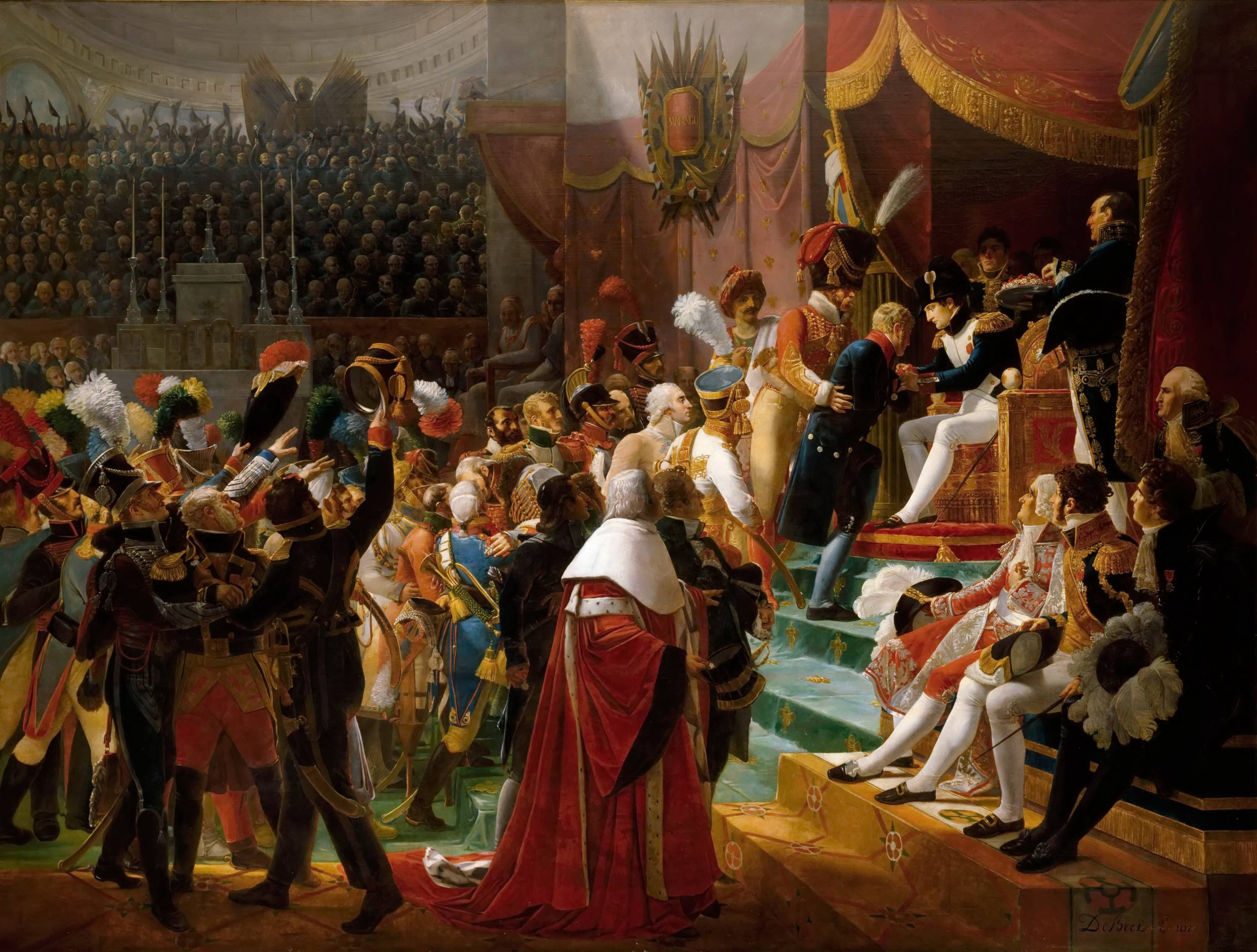
First remittance of the Legion of Honour, 15 July 1804, at Saint-Louis des Invalides, by Jean-Baptiste Debret (1812)

Napoleon instituted numerous reforms, many of which had a lasting influence on France, Europe, and the world. He reformed the French administration, codified French law, implemented a new education system, and established the first French central bank, the Banque de France. He negotiated the Concordat of 1801 with the Catholic Church, which sought to reconcile the majority Catholic population to his regime. It was presented alongside the Organic Articles, which regulated public worship in France. He also implemented civil and religious equality for Protestants and Jews. In May 1802 he instituted the Legion of Honour to encourage civilian and military achievements. The order is still the highest decoration in France. He introduced three French constitutions culminating in the reintroduction of a hereditary monarchy and nobility.

=== Administration ===
Napoleon introduced a series of centralizing administrative reforms soon after taking power. In 1800, he established prefects appointed to run France's regional departments, sub-prefects to run districts and mayors to run towns. Local representative bodies were retained, but their powers were reduced and indirect elections with a high property qualification replaced direct elections. Real power in the regions was now in the hands of the prefects who were judged by how they met the main priorities of Napoleon's government: efficient administration, law and order, stimulating the local economy, gathering votes for plebiscites, conscripting soldiers and provisioning the army.

An enduring reform was the foundation, in December 1799, of the Council of State, an advisory body of experts which could also draft laws for submission to the legislative body. Napoleon drew many of his ministers and ambassadors from the council. It was the council which undertook the codification of French law.

After several attempts by revolutionary governments, Napoleon officially introduced the metric system in France in 1801, and it was spread through western Europe by his armies. The system was unpopular in some circles, so in 1812 he introduced a compromise system in the retail trade called the mesures usuelles (traditional units of measurement). In December 1805, Napoleon abolished the revolutionary calendar, with its ten-day week, which had been introduced in 1793.

=== Napoleonic Code ===
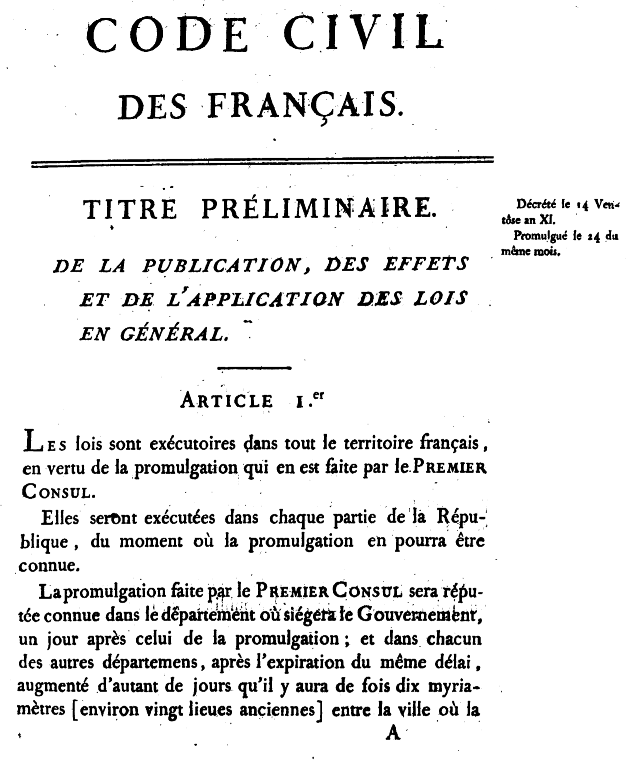
First page of the 1804 original edition of the Code Civil

Napoleon's civil code of laws, known from 1807 as the Napoleonic Code, was implemented in March 1804. It was prepared by committees of legal experts under the supervision of Jean Jacques Régis de Cambacérès, the Second Consul. Napoleon participated actively in the sessions of the Council of State that revised the drafts. The code introduced a clearly written and accessible set of national laws to replace the various regional and customary law systems that had operated in France.

The civil code entrenched the principles of equality before the law, religious toleration, secure property rights, equal inheritance for all legitimate children, and the abolition of the vestiges of feudalism. However, it also reduced the rights of women and children and severely restricted the grounds for divorce.

A criminal code was promulgated in 1808, and eventually seven codes of law were produced under Napoleon. The Napoleonic Code was carried by Napoleon's armies across Europe and influenced the law in many parts of the world. Alfred Cobban describes it as, "the most effective agency for the propagation of the basic principles of the French Revolution."

=== Warfare ===
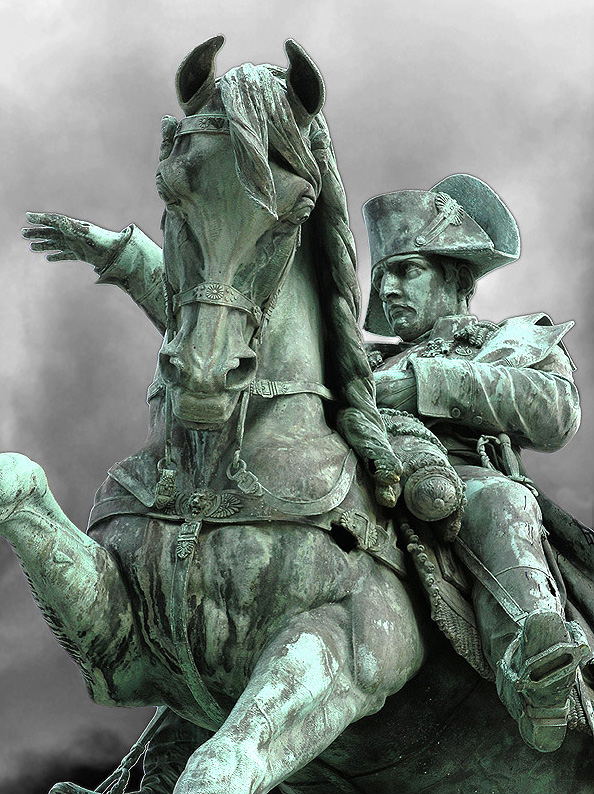
Statue in Cherbourg-Octeville unveiled by Napoleon III in 1858. Napoleon I strengthened the town's defences to prevent British naval incursions.

In the field of military organization, Napoleon borrowed from previous theorists such as Jacques Antoine Hippolyte, Comte de Guibert, and from the reforms of preceding French governments, and then developed what was already in place. He continued the revolutionary policies of conscription and promotion based primarily on merit.

Corps replaced divisions as the largest army units, mobile artillery was integrated into reserve batteries, the staff system became more fluid, and cavalry returned as an important formation in French military doctrine. These methods are now referred to as essential features of Napoleonic warfare.

Napoleon was regarded by the influential military theorist Carl von Clausewitz as a genius in the art of war, and many historians rank him as a great military commander. Wellington considers him the greatest military commander of all time, and Henry Vassall-Fox calls him "the greatest statesman and the ablest general of ancient or modern times". Cobban states that he showed his genius in moving troops quickly and concentrating them on strategic points. His principles were to keep his forces united, keep no weak point unguarded, seize important points quickly, and seize his chance. Owen Connelly, however, states, "Napoleon's personal tactics defy analysis." He used his intuition, engaged his troops, and reacted to what developed.

Napoleon was an aggressive commander with a preference for the offensive. Under Napoleon, the focus shifted towards destroying enemy armies rather than simply outmanoeuvering them. Wars became more costly and decisive as invasions of enemy territory occurred on larger fronts. The political cost of war also increased, as defeat for a European power meant more than just losing isolated territories. Peace terms were often punitive, sometimes involving regime change, which intensified the trend towards total war since the revolutionary era.

=== Education ===
Napoleon's educational reforms laid the foundation of a modern system of secondary and tertiary education in France and throughout much of Europe. He synthesized academic elements from the Ancien Régime, The Enlightenment, and the French Revolution. His education laws of 1802 left most primary education in the hands of religious or communal schools which taught basic literacy and numeracy for a minority of the population. He abolished the revolutionary central schools and replaced them with secondary schools and elite lycées where the curriculum was based on reading, writing, mathematics, Latin, natural history, classics, and ancient history.

He retained the revolutionary higher education system, with grandes écoles in professions including law, medicine, pharmacy, engineering and school teaching. He introduced grandes écoles in history and geography, but opposed one in literature because it was not vocational. He also founded the military academy of Saint Cyr. He promoted the advanced centres, such as the École Polytechnique, that provided both military expertise and advanced research in science.

In 1808, he founded the Imperial University, a supervisory body with control over curriculum and discipline. The following year he introduced the baccalaureate. The system was designed to produce the efficient bureaucrats, technicians, professionals and military officers that the Napoleonic state required. It outperformed its European counterparts, many of which borrowed from the French system. Female education, in contrast, was designed to be practical and religious, based on home science, the catechism, basic literacy and numeracy, and enough science to eradicate superstition.

=== Nobility and honours ===
In May 1802, Bonaparte created the Legion of Honour whose members would be military personnel and civilians with distinguished service to the state. The institution was unpopular with republicans, and the measure passed by 14 votes to 10 in the Council of State. The Legion of Honour became an order of chivalry after the empire was proclaimed in 1804. In August 1806, Napoleon created an hereditary imperial nobility including princes, dukes, counts, barons and knights. Eventually the empire had over 3,000 nobles and more than 30,000 members of the Legion of Honour.

== Memory and evaluation ==
=== Criticism ===
The Third of May 1808 by Francisco Goya, showing Spanish resisters being executed by French troops

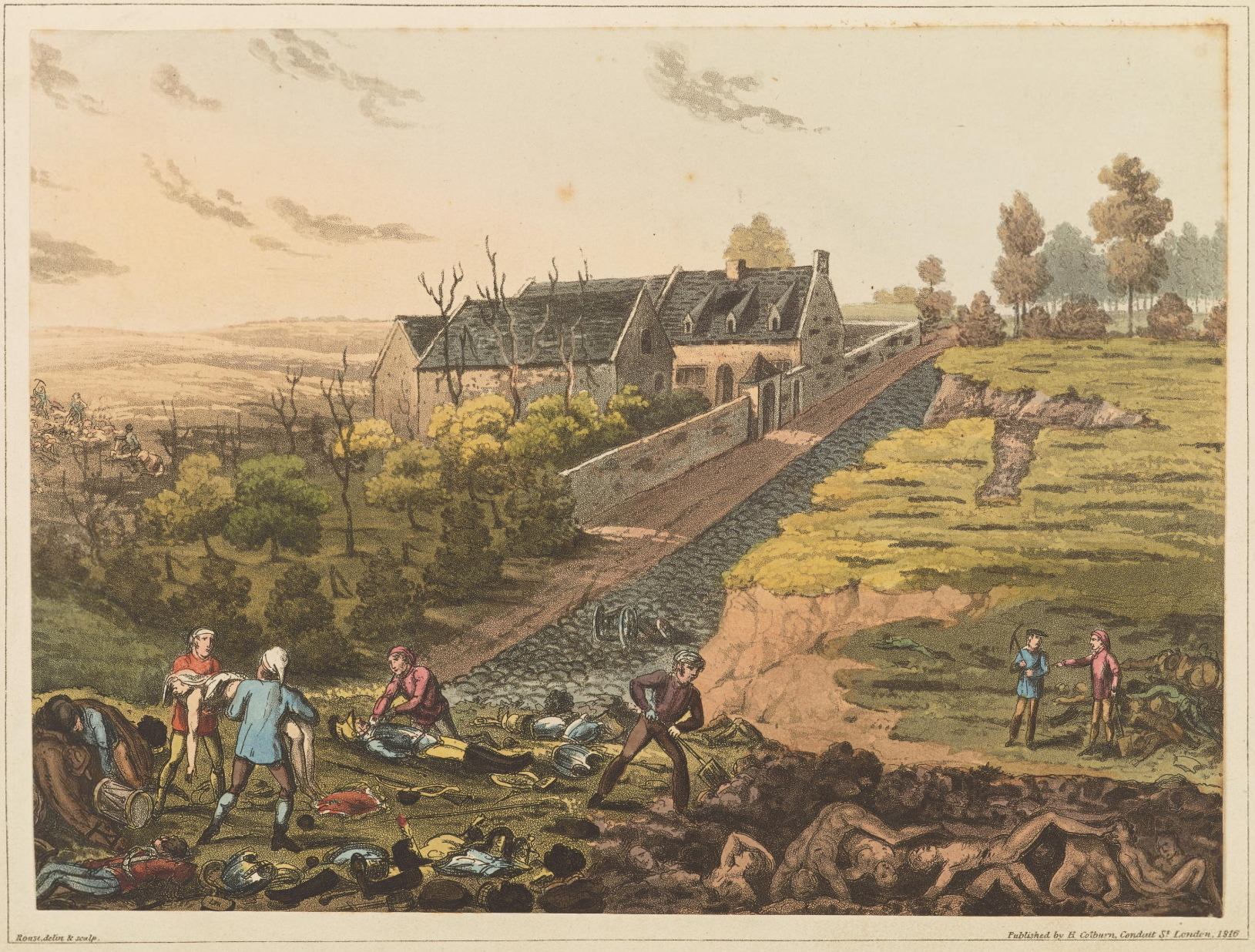
A mass grave of soldiers killed at the Battle of Waterloo

There is debate over whether Napoleon was "an enlightened despot who laid the foundations of modern Europe" or "a megalomaniac who wrought greater misery than any man before the coming of Hitler". He was compared to Adolf Hitler by Pieter Geyl in 1947 and Claude Ribbe in 2005. Most modern critics of Napoleon, however, reject the Hitler comparison, arguing that Napoleon did not commit genocide and did not engage in the mass murder and imprisonment of his political opponents. Nevertheless, David A. Bell and McLynn condemn his killing of 3,000–5,000 Turkish prisoners of war in Syria.

Historians have argued that his expansionist foreign policy was a major factor in the Napoleonic wars, which cost six million lives and caused economic disruption for a generation. McLynn and Correlli Barnett suggest that Napoleon's reputation as a military genius is exaggerated. Cobban and Susan P. Conner argue that Napoleon had insufficient regard for the lives of his soldiers and that his battle tactics led to excessive casualties.

Critics also cite Napoleon's exploitation of conquered territories. To finance his wars, Napoleon increased taxes and levies of troops from annexed territories and satellite states. He also introduced discriminatory tariff policies which promoted French trade at the expense of allies and satellite states. He institutionalized plunder: French museums contain art stolen by Napoleon's forces from across Europe. Artefacts were brought to the Musée du Louvre for a grand central museum, an example which would later be followed by others.

Many historians have criticized Napoleon's authoritarian rule, especially after 1807, which included censorship, the closure of independent newspapers, the bypassing of direct elections and representative government, the dismissal of judges showing independence, and the exile of critics of the regime. Historians also blame Napoleon for reducing the civil rights of women, children and people of colour, and reintroducing the legal penalties of civil death and confiscation of property. His reintroduction of an hereditary monarchy and nobility remains controversial. His role in the Haitian Revolution and decision to reinstate slavery in France's colonies in the Caribbean and Indian Ocean adversely affect his reputation.

=== Propaganda and memory ===
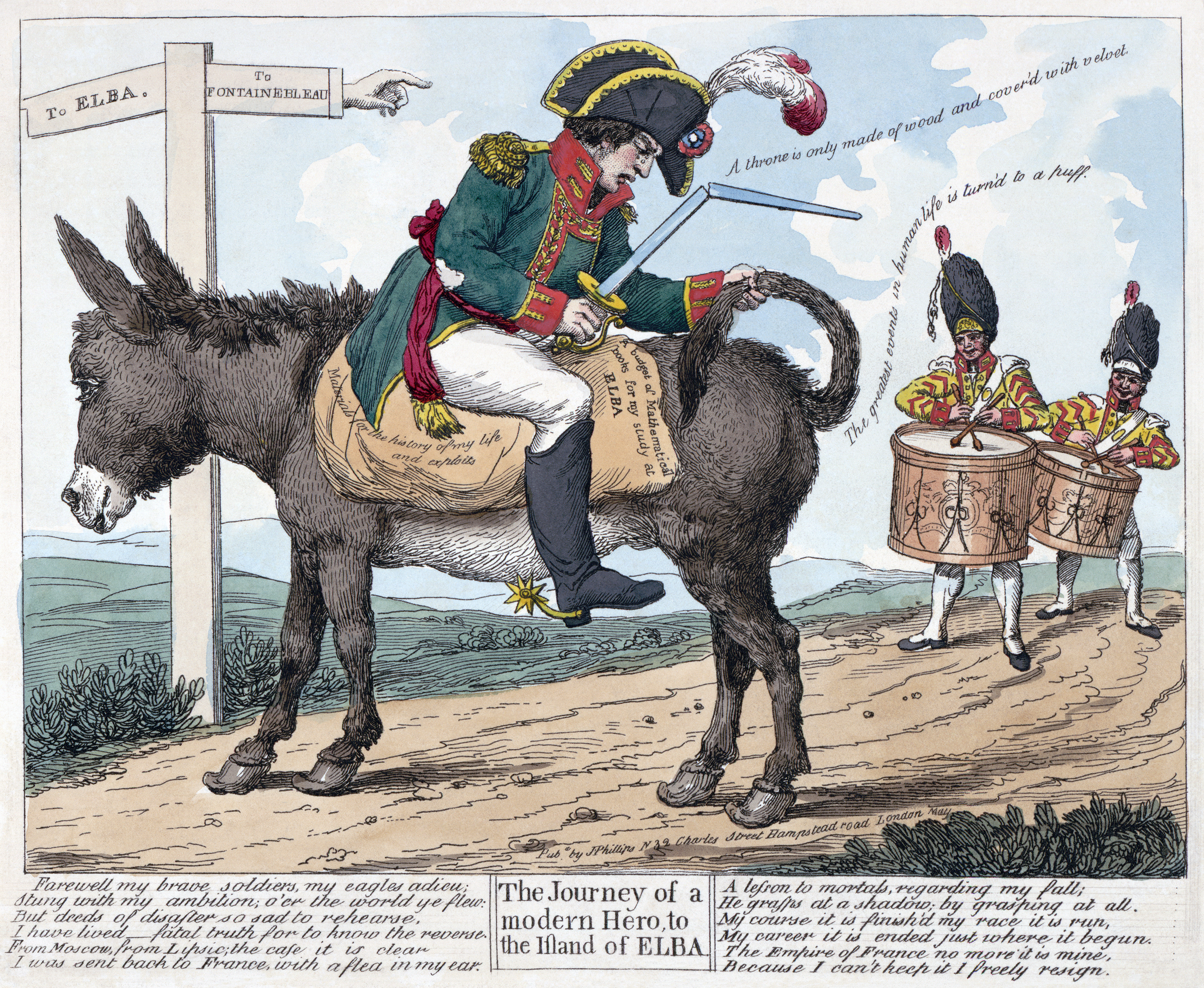
1814 English caricature of Napoleon being exiled to Elba: the ex-emperor is riding a donkey backwards while holding a broken sword.

Napoleon's use of propaganda contributed to his rise to power, legitimated his regime, and established his image for posterity. Strict censorship and control of the press, books, theatre, and art were part of his propaganda scheme, aimed at portraying him as bringing peace and stability to France. Propaganda focused on his role first as a general then as a civil leader and emperor. He fostered a relationship with artists, commissioning and controlling different forms of art to suit his propaganda goals. Napoleonic propaganda survived his exile to Saint Helena. Las Cases, who was with Napoleon in exile, published The Memorial of Saint Helena in 1822, creating a legend of Napoleon as a liberal, visionary proponent of European unification, deposed by reactionary elements of the ancien régime.

Napoleon remained a central figure in the romantic art and literature of the 1820s and 1830s. The Napoleonic legend played a key role in collective political defiance of the Bourbon restoration monarchy in 1815–1830. People from different walks of life and areas of France, particularly Napoleonic veterans, drew on the Napoleonic legacy and its connections with the ideals of the French Revolution. The defiance manifested itself in seditious materials, displaying the tricolour and rosettes. There were also subversive activities celebrating anniversaries of Napoleon's life and reign and disrupting royal celebrations.

Bell sees the return of Napoleon's remains to France in 1840 as an attempt by Louis-Phillipe to prop up his unpopular regime by associating it with Napoleon, and that the regime of Napoleon III was only possible with the continued resonance of the Napoleonic legend. Venita Datta argues that following the collapse of militaristic Boulangism in the late 1880s, the Napoleonic legend was divorced from party politics and revived in popular culture. Writers and critics of the Belle Époque exploited the Napoleonic legend for diverse political and cultural ends. In the 21st century, Napoleon appears regularly in popular fiction, drama and advertising. Napoleon and his era remain major topics of historical research with a sharp increase in historical books, articles and symposia during the bicentenary years of 1999 to 2015.

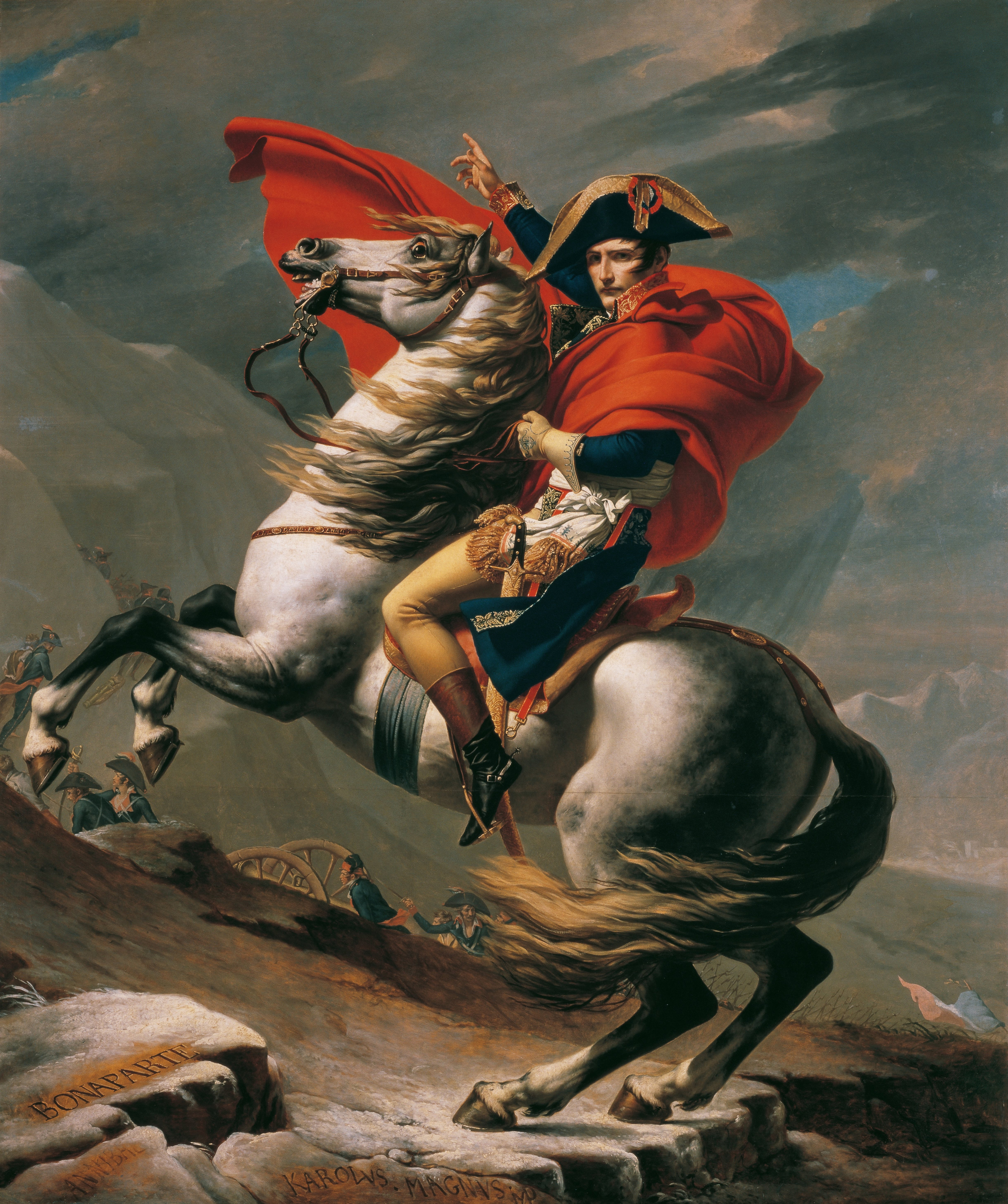
Napoleon Crossing the Alps, romantic version by Jacques-Louis David in 1805

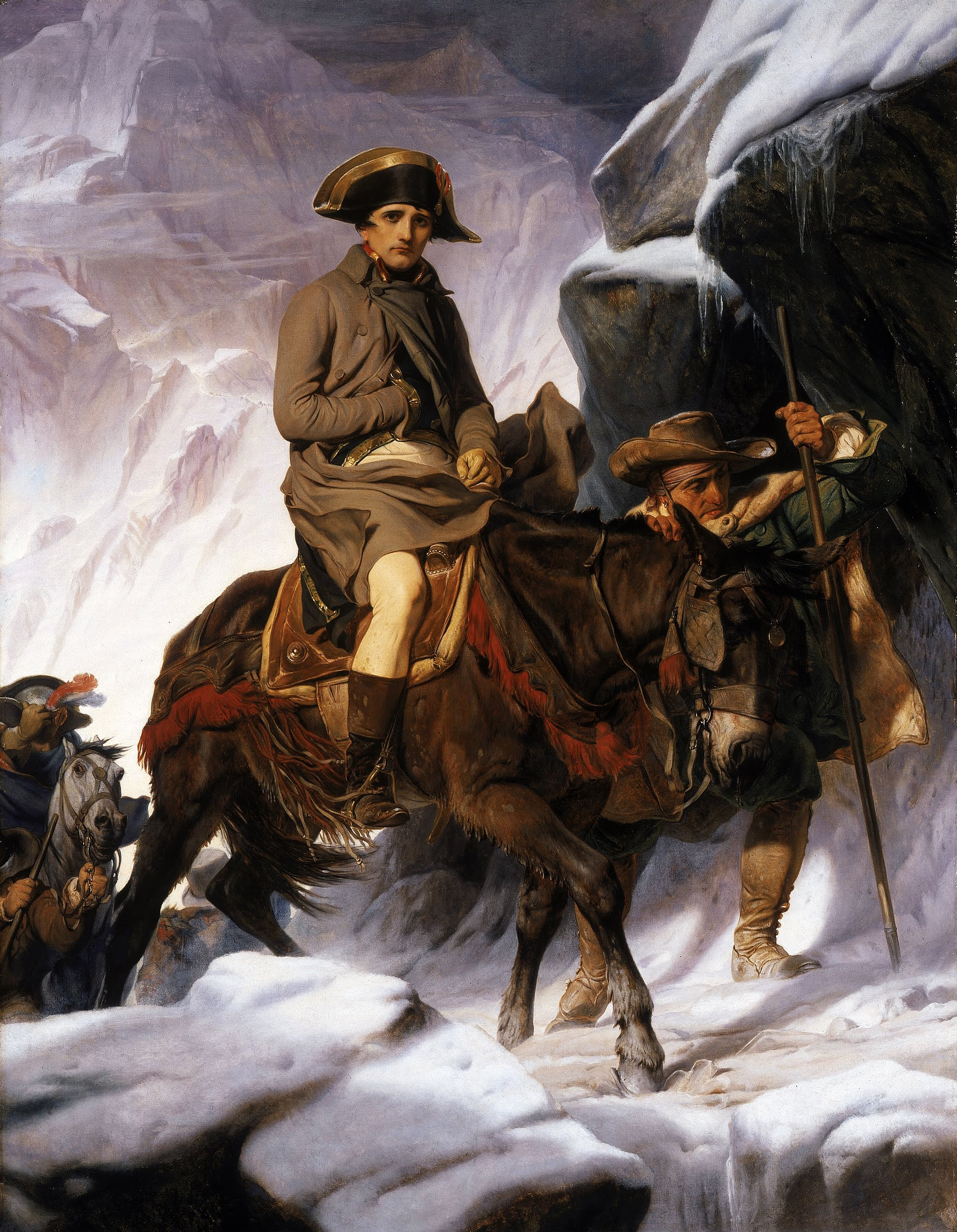
Bonaparte Crossing the Alps, realist version by Paul Delaroche in 1848

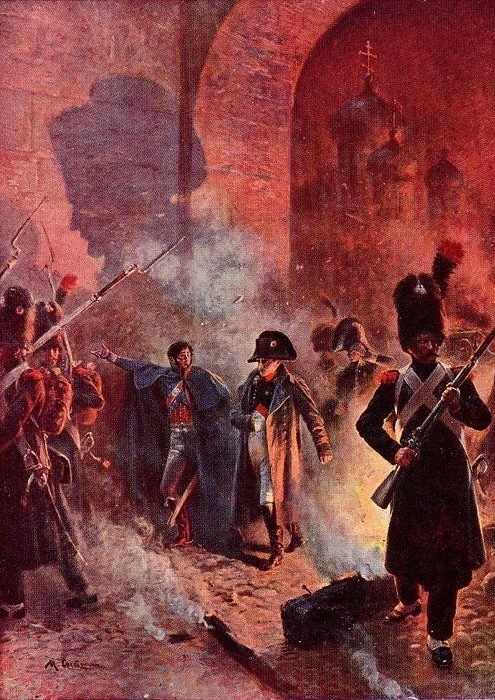
Moscow (1812). Napoleon leaves the Kremlin, part of the French occupation of Moscow, painting by Maurice Orange.

=== Long-term influence outside France ===
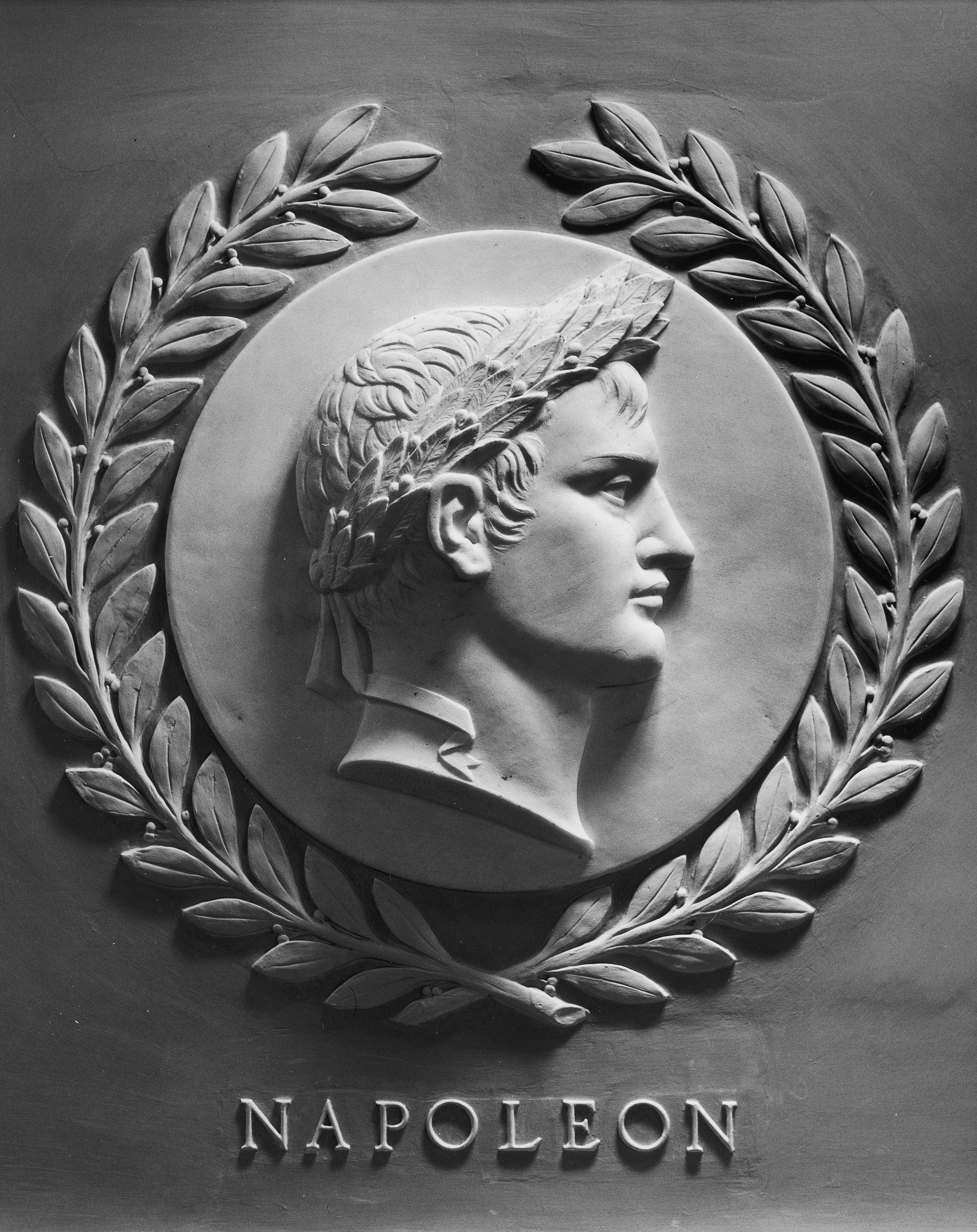
Bas-relief of Napoleon in the chamber of the United States House of Representatives

Napoleon was responsible for spreading many of the values of the French Revolution to other countries, especially through the Napoleonic Code. After the fall of Napoleon, it continued to influence the law in western Europe and other parts of the world including Latin America, the Dominican Republic, Louisiana and Quebec.

Napoleon's regime abolished remnants of feudalism in the lands he conquered and in his satellite states. He liberalized property laws, ended manorialism, abolished the guild of merchants and craftsmen to facilitate entrepreneurship, legalized divorce, closed the Jewish ghettos and ended the Spanish Inquisition. The power of church courts and religious authority was sharply reduced and equality before the law was proclaimed for all men.

Napoleon reorganized what had been the Holy Roman Empire, made up of about three hundred Kleinstaaterei, into a more streamlined forty-state Confederation of the Rhine; this helped promote the German Confederation and the unification of Germany in 1871, as it sparked a new wave of German nationalism that opposed the French intervention. The movement toward Italian unification was similarly sparked by Napoleonic rule. These changes contributed to the development of nationalism and the nation state.

The Napoleonic invasion of Spain and ousting of the Spanish Bourbon monarchy had a significant effect on Spanish America. Many local elites sought to rule in the name of Ferdinand VII, whom they considered the legitimate monarch. Napoleon indirectly began the process of Latin American independence when the power vacuum was filled by local political leaders such as Simón Bolívar and José de San Martín. Such leaders embraced nationalistic sentiments influenced by French nationalism and led successful independence movements in Latin America. Napoleon's reputation is generally favourable in Poland, which is the only country in the world to evoke him in its national anthem, Poland Is Not Yet Lost.

== Children ==
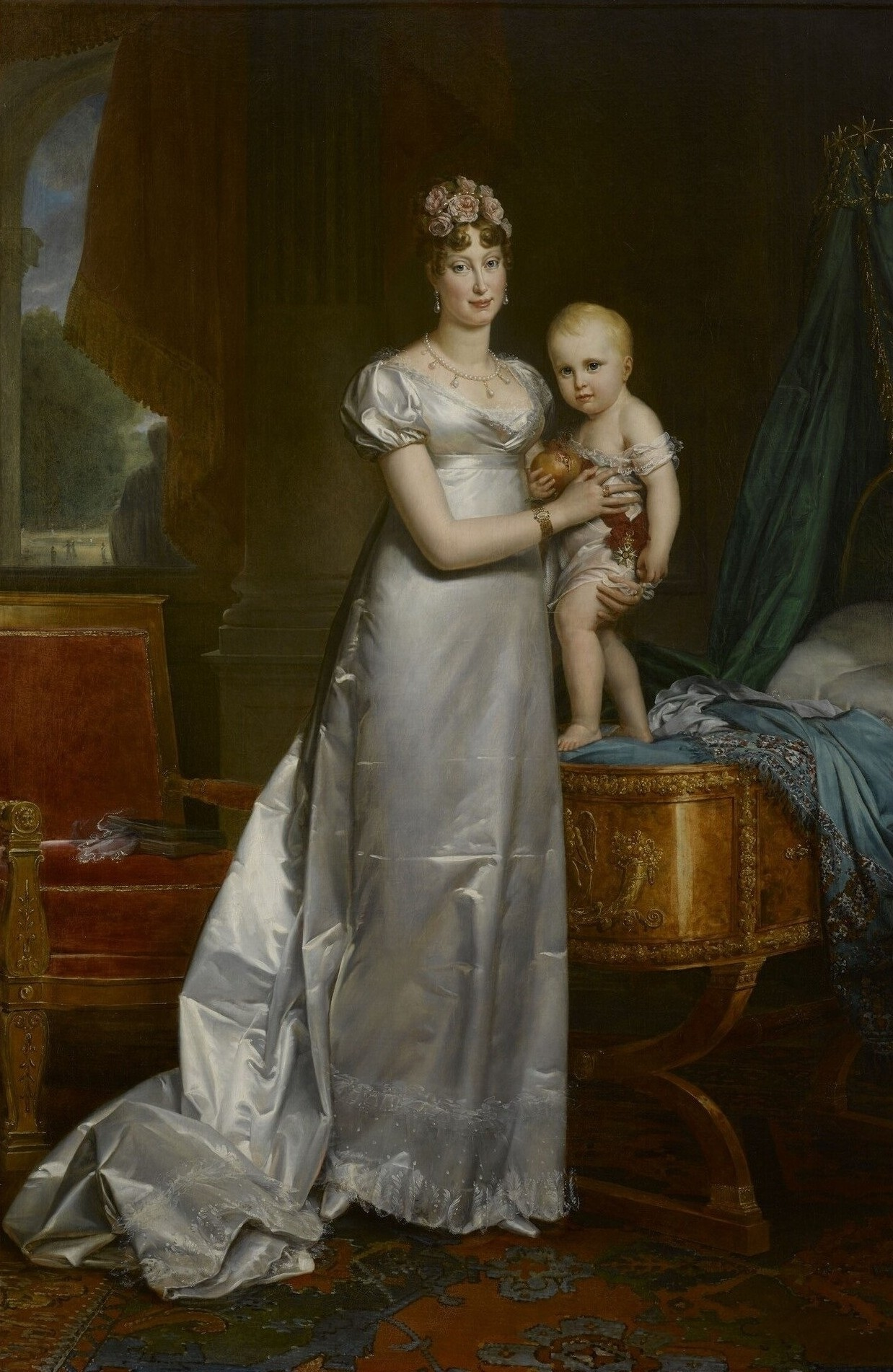
Empress Marie Louise and her son Napoleon, by François Gérard, 1813

Napoleon married Joséphine in 1796, but the marriage produced no children. In 1806, he adopted his stepson Eugène de Beauharnais and his second cousin Stéphanie de Beauharnais, and he arranged dynastic marriages for them.

Napoleon's marriage to Marie Louise produced one child, Napoleon Francis Joseph Charles (Napoleon II), known from birth as the King of Rome. When Napoleon abdicated in 1815, he named his son his successor as "Napoleon II", but the allies refused to recognize him. He was awarded the title of the Duke of Reichstadt in 1818 and died of tuberculosis aged 21, with no children.

Napoleon acknowledged one illegitimate son: Charles Léon by Eléonore Denuelle de La Plaigne. Alexandre Colonna-Walewski, the son of his Polish mistress Maria Walewska, was also widely known to be his child, as DNA evidence has confirmed. He may have had further illegitimate offspring.

== Arms ==
On becoming emperor, Napoleon adopted the French Imperial Eagle as his arms.

Imperial arms of Napoleon

Arms: Azure, an Eagle Or, head facing to the sinister, clutching in its talons a Thunderbolt Or.

Achievement of Napoleon

Arms and achievement of Napoleon · · · · · · ·

== See also ==
- List of Parisian structures commissioned by Napoleon I

== Works cited ==
=== Biographical studies ===
- Barnett, Correlli (1997) [1978]. Bonaparte. Ware: Wordsworth. ISBN 1-85326-678-7.
- Bell, David A. (2015). Napoleon: A Concise Biography. Oxford and New York: Oxford University Press. ISBN 978-0-19-026271-6. Archived from the original on 7 December 2023.
- Blaufarb, Rafe (2008). Napoleon: Symbol for an Age, A Brief History with Documents. Bedford. ISBN 978-0-312-43110-5.
- Broers, Michael (2015). Napoleon: Soldier of Destiny. London: Faber and Faber. ISBN 978-0-571-27345-4. OCLC 898153545.
- Broers, Michael (2022). Napoleon: The Decline and Fall of an Empire, 1811–1821. New York: Pegasus books. ISBN 978-1-63936-177-9.
- Chandler, David (2002). Napoleon. Leo Cooper. ISBN 978-0-85052-750-6.
- Kircheisen, Friedrich (1972) [1932]. Napoleon. Freeport, NY: Harcourt Brace, & Co. ISBN 978-0-8369-6981-8. OCLC 416913. Archived from the original on 2 December 2023.
- Cronin, Vincent (1994). Napoleon. HarperCollins. ISBN 978-0-00-637521-0.
- Dwyer, Philip (2008a). Napoleon: The Path to Power. Yale University Press. ISBN 978-0-300-13754-5.
- Dwyer, Philip (2013). Citizen Emperor: Napoleon in Power 1799–1815. Yale University Press. ISBN 978-0-300-21253-2.
- Dwyer, Phillip (2018). Napoleon: Passion, Death and Resurrection, 1815–1840. Oxford: Bloomsbury Publishing. ISBN 978-1-4088-9175-9.
- Englund, Steven (2010). Napoleon: A Political Life. Scribner. ISBN 978-0-674-01803-7. Archived from the original on 2 December 2023.
- Gueniffey, Patrice (2015) [2013]. Bonaparte: 1769–1802. Harvard University Press. ISBN 978-0-674-36835-4.; 1008 pp.; vol 1 excerpt Archived 19 October 2016 at the Wayback Machine; also online review Archived 23 March 2018 at the Wayback Machine
- Lyons, Martyn (1994). Napoleon Bonaparte and the Legacy of the French Revolution. St. Martin's Press.
- McLynn, Frank (1997). Napoleon: a Biography. London: Jonathan Cape. ISBN 0-224-04072-3.
- Price, Munro (2014). Napoleon: The End of Glory. Oxford University Press. ISBN 978-0-19-966080-3. Archived from the original on 5 December 2023.
- Roberts, Andrew (2014). Napoleon: A Life. Penguin Group. ISBN 978-0-670-02532-9.
- Zamoyski, Adam (2018). Napoleon: The Man Behind The Myth. Great Britain: HarperCollins. ISBN 978-0-00-811607-1.

=== Historiography and memory ===
- Dwyer, Philip (2008b). "Remembering and Forgetting in Contemporary France: Napoleon, Slavery, and the French History Wars". French Politics, Culture & Society. 26 (3): 110–22. doi:10.3167/fpcs.2008.260306.
- Geyl, Pieter (1949). Napoleon: For and Against. London: Jonathan Cape.
- Roberts, Andrew (2001). Napoleon and Wellington: the Battle of Waterloo and the Great commanders who fought it. Simon & Schuster. ISBN 978-0-7432-2832-9.

=== Specialty studies ===
- Amini, Iradj (2000). Napoleon and Persia. Taylor & Francis. ISBN 978-0-934211-58-1.
- Bordes, Philippe (2007). Jacques-Louis David. Yale University Press. ISBN 978-0-300-12346-3.
- Chandler, David (1966). The Campaigns of Napoleon. New York: Scribner. ISBN 978-0-02-523660-8. OCLC 740560411.
- Chandler, David G. (1995) [1966]. The Campaigns of Napoleon. New York: Simon & Schuster. ISBN 0-02-523660-1.
- Chandler, David (1973) [1966]. Napoleon. Saturday Review Press. ISBN 978-0-8415-0254-3.
- Cobban, Alfred (1986) [1963]. A History of Modern France, Volume 2: 1799–1871 (2nd ed.). London: Penguin Books. ISBN 0-14-020525-X.
- Connelly, Owen (2006). Blundering to Glory: Napoleon's Military Campaigns. Rowman & Littlefield. ISBN 978-0-7425-5318-7.
- Conner, Susan P. (2004). The Age of Napoleon. Westport, Connecticut: Greenwood Press. ISBN 0-313-32014-4.
- Cordingly, David (2004). The Billy Ruffian: The Bellerophon and the Downfall of Napoleon. Bloomsbury. ISBN 978-1-58234-468-3.
- Dwyer, Phillip (2015a). "Napoleon, the Revolution and the Empire". In Andress, David (ed.). The Oxford Handbook of the French Revolution. Oxford: Oxford University Press. ISBN 978-0-19-963974-8.
- Ellis, Geoffrey (1997a). "Religion according to Napoleon". In Aston, Nigel (ed.). Religious change in Europe, 1650–1914: essays for John McManners. Oxford: Clarendon Press. ISBN 0-19-820596-1.
- Esdaile, Charles J. (2003). The Peninsular War: A New History. Macmillan. ISBN 978-1-4039-6231-7.
- Esdaile, Charles (2007). Napoleon's Wars: An International History, 1803–1815. London: Allen Lane. ISBN 978-0-14-190946-2.
- Flynn, George Q. (2001). Conscription and democracy: The Draft in France, Great Britain, and the United States. Greenwood Publishing Group. ISBN 978-0-313-31912-9.
- Fremont-Barnes, Gregory; Fisher, Todd (2004). The Napoleonic Wars: The Rise and Fall of an Empire. Osprey. ISBN 978-1-84176-831-1.
- Gates, David (2003). The Napoleonic Wars, 1803–1815. Pimlico. ISBN 978-0-7126-0719-3.
- Glover, Richard (1967). "The French Fleet, 1807–1814; Britain's Problem; and Madison's Opportunity". The Journal of Modern History. 39 (3): 233–52. doi:10.1086/240080. S2CID 143376566.
- Grab, Alexander (2017). Napoleon and the Transformation of Europe. Bloomsbury Publishing. ISBN 978-1-4039-3757-5. Archived from the original on 2 December 2023.
- Grab, Alexander (2003). Napoleon and the Transformation of Europe. Palgrave. ISBN 978-0-333-68275-3.
- Harvey, Robert (2007). The War of Wars: The Epic Struggle Between Britain and France, 1789–1815. Robinson. ISBN 978-1-84529-635-3.
- Hindmarsh, J. Thomas; Savory, John (2008). "The Death of Napoleon, Cancer or Arsenic?". Clinical Chemistry. 54 (12): 2092. doi:10.1373/clinchem.2008.117358.
- Mikaberidze, Alexander (2026). The Louisiana Purchase: The Grand Bargain and the Making of America. Oxford University Press. ISBN 978-0-19-754814-1.
- O'Connor, J; Robertson, E F (2003). "The history of measurement". St Andrew's University.
- Roberts, Chris (2004). Heavy Words Lightly Thrown. Granta. ISBN 978-1-86207-765-2. Archived from the original on 7 December 2023.
- Schom, Alan (1997). Napoleon Bonaparte. HarperCollins. ISBN 978-0-06-017214-5.
- Watson, William (2003). Tricolor and crescent. Greenwood Publishing Group. ISBN 978-0-275-97470-1. Archived from the original on 7 December 2023.
- Sicker, Martin (2001). The Islamic World in Decline: From the Treaty of Karlowitz to the Disintegration of the Ottoman Empire. Greenwood. p. 99. ISBN 978-0-275-96891-5.
- Wells, David (1992). The Penguin Dictionary of Curious and Interesting Geometry. Penguin Books. ISBN 978-0-14-011813-1.

Napoleon I of France House of Bonaparte Born: 15 August 1769 Died: 5 May 1821
Political offices
New title Directory dissolved	Provisional Consul of the French Republic; 11 November – 12 December 1799; Served alongside: Roger Ducos and Emmanuel Joseph Sieyès	Became First Consul
New title Consulate established	First Consul of the French Republic; 12 December 1799 – 18 May 1804; Served alongside: Jean Jacques Régis de Cambacérès (Second Consul); Charles-François Lebrun (Third Consul)	Became Emperor
New title Italian Republic established	President of the Italian Republic; 26 January 1802 – 17 March 1805	Vacant (Became King) Title next held by Enrico De Nicola
New title Helvetic Republic dissolved	Mediator of the Swiss Confederation; 19 February 1803 – 19 October 1813	New Confederation established
Regnal titles
Vacant French Revolution Title last held by Louis XVI as King of the French	Emperor of the French; 18 May 1804 – 11 April 1814	Succeeded by Louis XVIII as King of France and Navarre
Vacant Title last held by Charles V, Holy Roman Emperor as last crowned monarch, 1530	King of Italy; 17 March 1805 – 11 April 1814	Vacant Title next held by Victor Emmanuel II of Savoy
Vacant Title last held by Louis XVI	Co-Prince of Andorra; 1806 – 11 April 1814	Succeeded by Louis XVIII
New title State created	Protector of the Confederation of the Rhine; 12 July 1806 – 19 October 1813	Confederation dissolved successive ruler: Francis I of Austria as Head of the Präsidialmacht Austria
New title	Sovereign of the Island of Elba; 11 April 1814 – 20 March 1815	Relinquished title
Preceded by Louis XVIII as King of France and Navarre	Emperor of the French; Co-Prince of Andorra; 20 March – 22 June 1815	Succeeded by Louis XVIII as King of France and Navarre (Napoleon II according to his will only)
Titles in pretence
New title	— TITULAR — Emperor of the French; 11 April 1814 – 20 March 1815	Vacant Title next held by Napoleon II
