= Assassination attempts on Napoleon =

Historian Philip Dwyer claims Napoleon faced between 20 and 30 assassination plots during his reign over France.

== Coup of 18 Brumaire ==
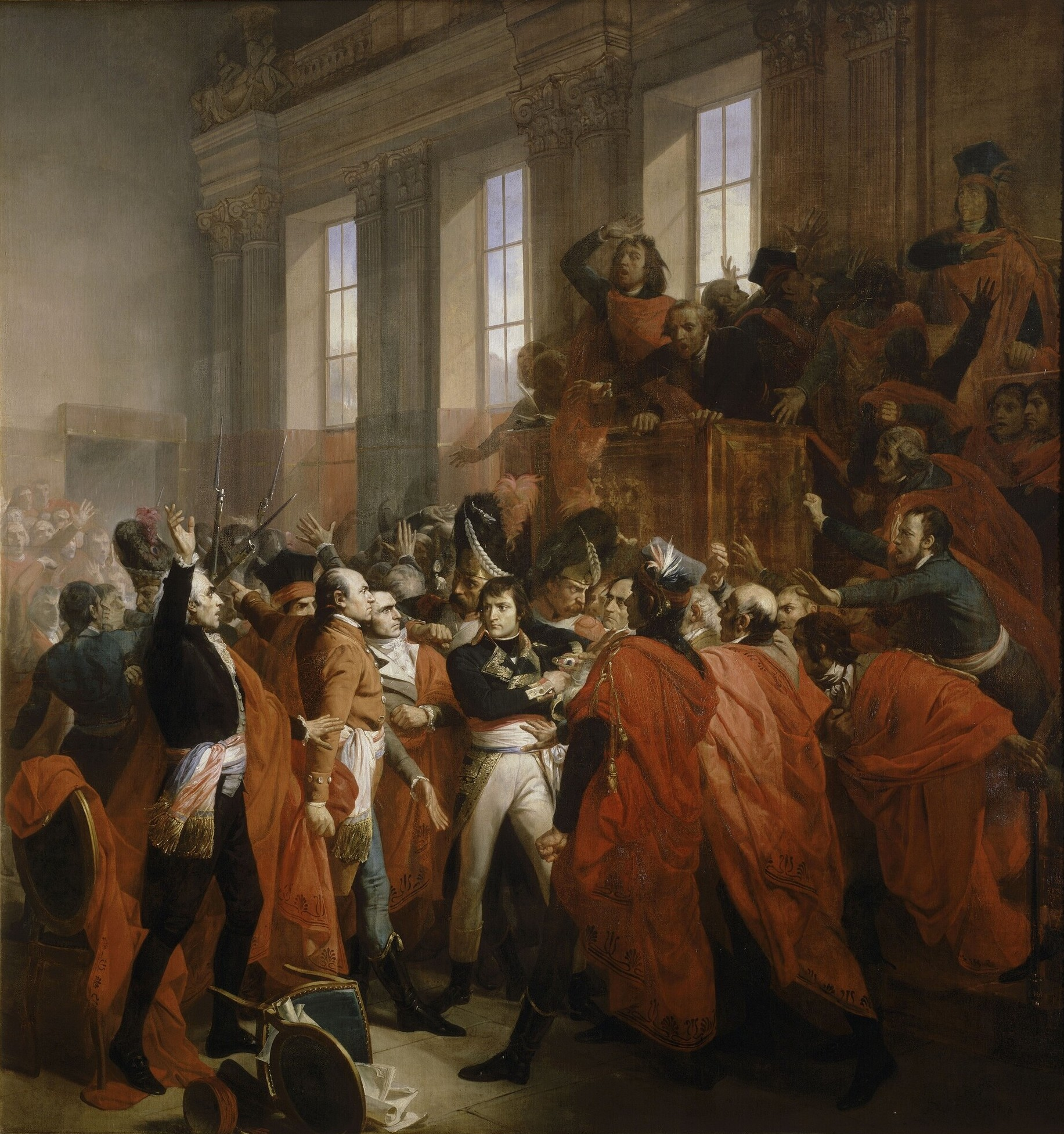
Bonaparte at the Council of Five Hundred at Saint-Cloud, by François Bouchot, 1840

According to Napoleon;

I offered myself to the Chamber of Five Hundred, alone, unarmed, my head uncovered.... Instantly the daggers which menaced the deputies were raised against their defender. Twenty assassins rushed upon me, aiming at my breast. The grenadiers of the Legislative Body, whom I had left at the door of the chamber, hastily interposed between the assassins and myself. One of these brave grenadiers... received a thrust from a dagger, which pierced his clothes. They carried me off.

There is doubt as to whether a dagger was raised as such, but it served to justify the coup.

== Poisoning and other attempts at Malmaison ==
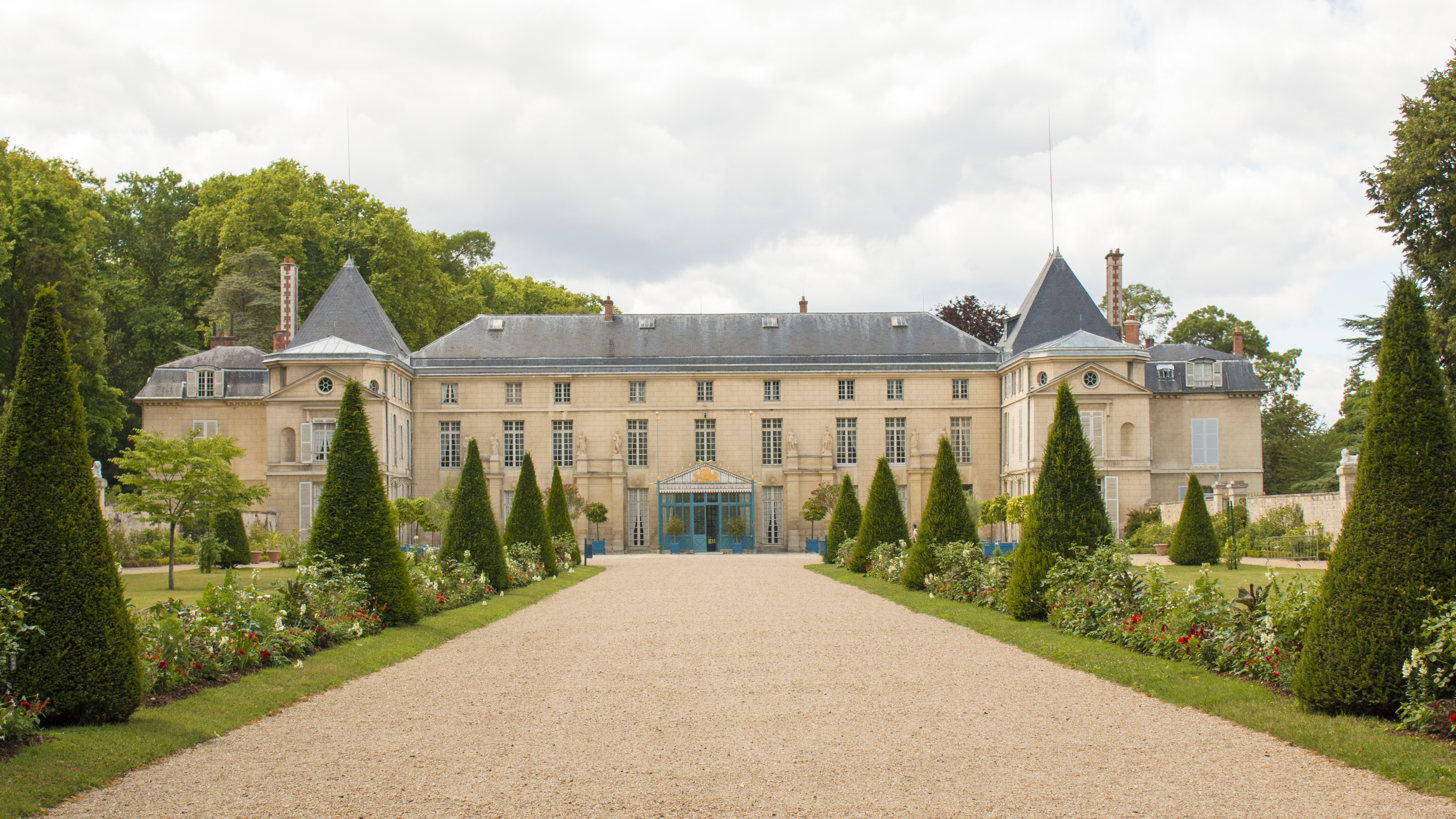
The Château de Malmaison

After Napoleon became First Consul, Malmaison – an estate west of Paris, owned by Napoleon's wife Joséphine – became the site of several alleged assassination plots. According to Napoleon's valet Louis Constant, this included a poisoning attempt.

Sundry alterations and repairs had to be made in the chimney-piece of the First Consul's apartments at La Malmaison. The person superintending this work sent certain stone-cutters, some of whom were in league with the conspirators.... Just as the First Consul was about to take up his residence in the newly-prepared apartments, upon a desk at which he sat a snuff-box was found, precisely similar to one which he was in the habit of using. At first they supposed that it actually belonged to him, and that it had been left there by his valet-de-chambre. But the suspicions aroused by the strange appearance of some of the workmen took deeper root. The snuff was taken out and analysed. It was poisoned.

Constant continues:

The perpetrators of this dastardly outrage were at that time in league... with other conspirators, who intended to resort to other means in order to get rid of the First Consul. They thought of attacking the Malmaison guards, and of forcibly abducting the head of the Government. For this purpose they had uniforms made exactly like those of the Guides Consulaires, who, night and day, were in attendance on the First Consul. In this disguise, and with the help of their confederates, the sham stone-cutters, they might easily have mixed with the guards who were lodged and boarded at the castle. They could even have got at the First Consul and carried him off. This first scheme, however, was abandoned as too risky, and the conspirators flattered themselves that they would gain their ends in a surer, less perilous way, viz., by taking advantage of the General's frequent journeys to Paris. In such disguise they could join the escort, unnoticed, and murder him on the highway. Their meeting-place was to be the Nanterre quarries. But their plot was again discovered, and, as in the Malmaison park there was a rather deep quarry, it was feared that they might hide here and do the General some injury when he walked out by himself. So the entrance to this place was closed with an iron gate.

Constant may have been referring to an alleged plot by a man named Juvenot, a former aide-de-camp to the executed Jacobin leader François Hanriot. According to Napoleon's Minister of Police Joseph Fouché, Juvenot was conspiring in mid-1800 with "some twenty zealots" to attack and murder Napoleon near Malmaison. The plan was to block the road to Malmaison with carts and bundles of firewood; when Napoleon's carriage was forced to stop, the conspirators would shoot him. They also thought of setting fire to cottages near Malmaison, expecting that Napoleon's staff would run to put out the flames, leaving the First Consul unguarded. Fouché had Juvenot and his accomplices arrested, but was unable to extract a confession.

== Conspiration des poignards ==
In September 1800, Napoleon's private secretary Louis Antoine Fauvelet de Bourrienne was contacted by an out-of-work soldier named Harrel, who said he had been approached to take part in a plot against Napoleon's life. Bourrienne took the matter to Napoleon, who directed the police to supply Harrel with money so the guilty parties could carry on and be caught in the act. The conspirators planned to approach Napoleon at the opera in Paris and stab him to death. The date fixed for the assassination was October 10, 1800, at the premiere of Les Horaces. According to Bourrienne:

On the evening of the 10th of October, the consuls... assembled in the cabinet of their colleague. Bonaparte asked them, in my presence, whether they thought he ought to go to the opera? They observed that as every precaution was taken, no danger could be apprehended; and that it was desirable to show the futility of attempts against the First Consul's life. After dinner Bonaparte put on a great coat over his green uniform, and got into his carriage, accompanied by me and Duroc. He seated himself in front of his box, which at that time was on the left of the theatre, between the two columns which separated the front and side boxes. When we had been in the theatre about half an hour, the First Consul directed me to go and see what was doing in the lobby. Scarcely had I left the box than I heard a great uproar, and soon discovered that a number of persons, whose names I could not learn, had been arrested. I informed the First Consul of what I had heard, and we immediately returned to the Tuileries.

According to Fouché, the would-be assassins were Jacobin extremists. The accused, however, blamed Harrel and other agents provocateurs.

The conspirators wished, without the least doubt, the death of the First Consul, but they were incapable of striking him with their own hands.... None of them had had the courage, nor perhaps even any decided intention, to assist in the execution of the plot. The police agents, sent in as spies amongst them, and to whom they gave daggers, urged them on to a degree of guilt, which before, perhaps, they had not contemplated.... [T]hey did not make their appearance at the place fixed for the execution of the plot; and Ceracchi, the only one apprehended in the Opera-house, was not even armed with one of the daggers which had been distributed among them.

A recent study by Jonathan North points out that this plot had all the hallmarks of a police entrapment. Nevertheless, four of the men arrested – painter François Topino-Lebrun, sculptor Giuseppe Ceracchi, adjutant Joseph Antoine Aréna, and Dominique Demerville, a former clerk to the Committee of Public Safety – were executed on January 30, 1801.

== Plot of the rue Saint-Nicaise ==
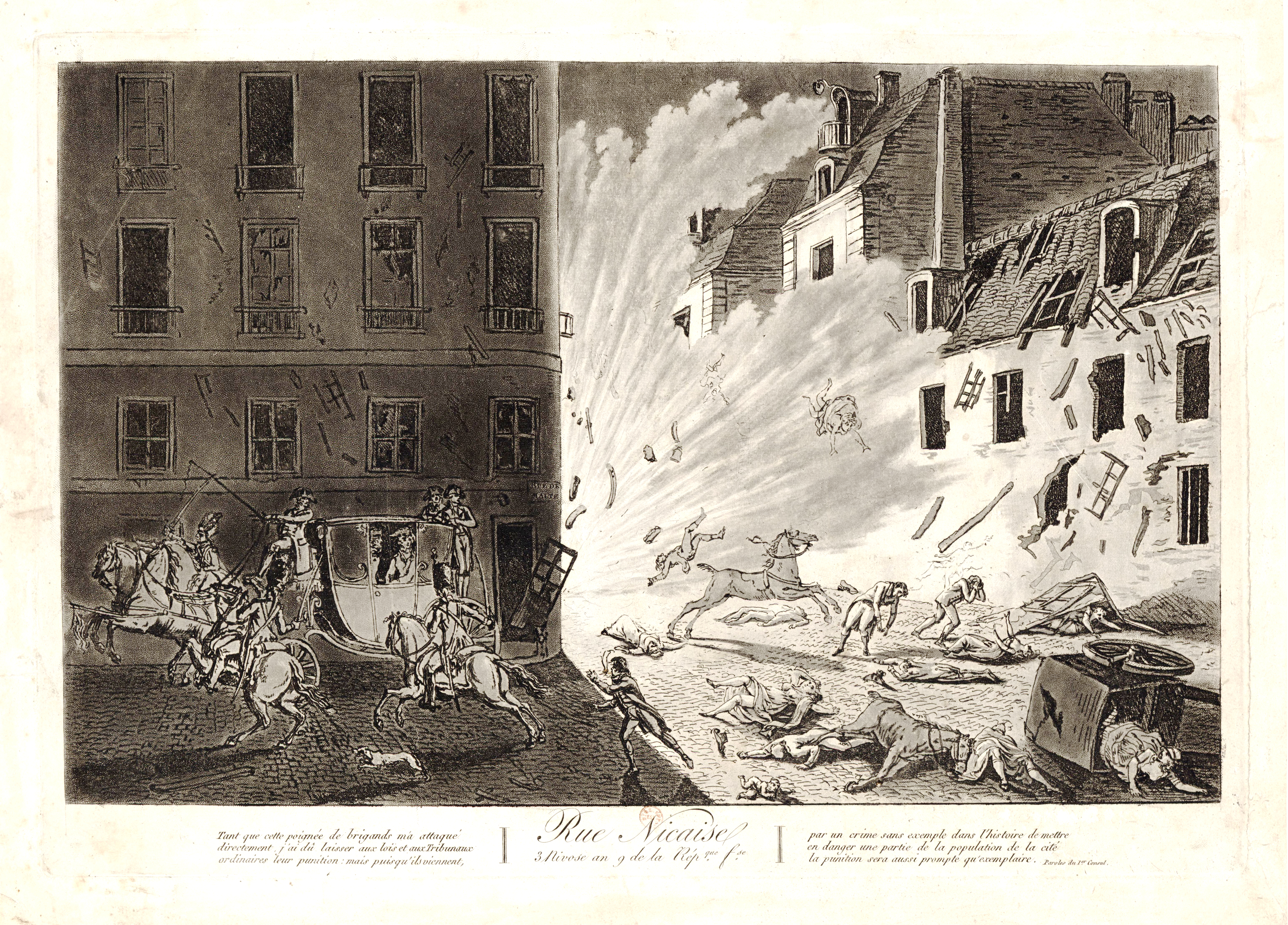
Etching of the plot of the rue Saint-Nicaise

Perhaps the best-known assassination attempt against Napoleon occurred in Paris on the evening of December 24, 1800. Napoleon was heading to the opera to see the French premiere of Joseph Haydn's oratorio The Creation when a cart exploded in the street shortly after his carriage had passed.

The attack was carried out by royalists linked to the Chouan leader Georges Cadoudal, who was in the pay of the British government. The conspirators bought a horse and cart from a Parisian grain dealer, attached a large wine cask to the cart, and loaded the cask with shrapnel and gunpowder. They drove this "infernal machine" to Rue Saint-Nicaise (which no longer exists), near the intersection with rue Saint-Honoré, on Napoleon's route to the opera. One of the plotters paid 14-year-old Marianne Peusol, whose mother sold buns nearby, twelve sous to hold the horse and guard the cart while the would-be assassin stood at some distance with the fuse.

The conspirators expected Napoleon's carriage to be preceded by a cavalry escort. The escort's appearance would be the signal to light the powder. However, Napoleon's coachman was driving very fast (some accounts say he was drunk), and the carriage appeared without warning. As noted in evidence at the subsequent trial:

The person who was to have executed the plan, not being properly instructed, was not aware of the arrival of the carriage of the First Consul until he saw it. It was not, as he had been told, preceded by an advanced guard; however he prepared to execute his plan. At that moment the horse of a grenadier drove him against the wall and deranged him. He returned, and set fire to the machine; but the powder not being good, its effect was two or three seconds too late, otherwise the First Consul must inevitably have perished.

The explosion killed the horse, young Marianne, and as many as a dozen bystanders. Some 40 others were wounded, and several buildings were damaged or destroyed. Napoleon's wife Joséphine, her daughter Hortense de Beauharnais, and Napoleon's sister Caroline Murat (pregnant with her son Achille) were travelling in a carriage behind Napoleon's. They might have been killed had they not been delayed by fiddling with Joséphine's shawl, as described by General Jean Rapp, who accompanied the women.

The police had intimated to Napoleon that an attempt would be made against his life, and cautioned him not to go out. Madame Bonaparte, Mademoiselle Beauharnais, Madame Murat, Lannes, Bessières, the aide-de-camp on duty, and lieutenant Lebrun, now duke of Placenza, were all assembled in the saloon, while the First Consul was writing in his closet. Haydn's Oratorio was to be performed that evening: the ladies were anxious to hear the music, and we also expressed a wish to that effect. The Escort piquet was ordered out; and Lannes requested that Napoleon would join the party. He consented; his carriage was ready, and he took along with him Bessières and the aide-de-camp on duty. I was directed to attend the ladies.

Joséphine had received a magnificent shawl from Constantinople, and she that evening wore it for the first time. 'Allow me to observe, Madame,' said I, 'that your shawl is not thrown on with your usual elegance.' She good humouredly begged that I would fold it after the fashion of the Egyptian ladies. While I was engaged in this operation, we heard Napoleon depart. 'Come, sister,' said Madame Murat, who was impatient to get to the theatre; 'Bonaparte is going.'

We stepped into the carriage: the First Consul's equipage had already reached the middle of the Place Carrousel. We drove after it; but we had scarcely entered the Place when the machine exploded. Napoleon escaped by a singular chance. Saint-Regent [one of the conspirators], or his French servant, had stationed himself in the middle of the Rue Nicaise. A grenadier of the escort, supposing he was really what he appeared to be, a water-carrier, gave him a few blows with the flat of his sabre, and drove him off. The cart was turned round, and the machine exploded between the carriages of Napoleon and Joséphine.

The ladies shrieked on hearing the report; the carriage windows were broken, and Mademoiselle Beauharnais received a slight hurt on her hand. I alighted and crossed the Rue Nicaise, which was strewed with the bodies of those who had been thrown down, and the fragments of the walls that had been shattered by the explosion. Neither the Consul nor any individual of his suite sustained any serious injury. When I entered the theatre Napoleon was seated in his box, calm and composed, and looking at the audience through his opera-glass. Fouché was beside him. 'Joséphine,' said he, as soon as he observed me. She entered at that moment, and he did not finish his question. 'The rascals,' said he, very coolly, 'wanted to blow me up. Bring me a book of the Oratorio.'

Though Fouché believed that royalists were behind the attack, Napoleon was initially convinced that his Jacobin enemies were responsible. He used the explosion as an excuse to exile 130 Jacobins from France. Meanwhile, police assembled the remains of the cart and horse and appealed for information. The man who had sold the horse and cart came forward, as did the blacksmith who shoed the horse, and described the suspect. Information provided by General Girardon provided a name to the police, and gave an idea as to the whereabouts of a certain Corbon [sic]. This led them to François Carbon, the man who made the bomb. Carbon confessed the names of fellow conspirators Pierre Robinault de Saint-Régent and Joseph de Limoëlan, as well as others. Carbon and Saint-Régent were executed on April 20, 1801. Limoëlan fled to the United States where he became a priest and died in Charleston in 1826.

== Pichegru Conspiracy ==
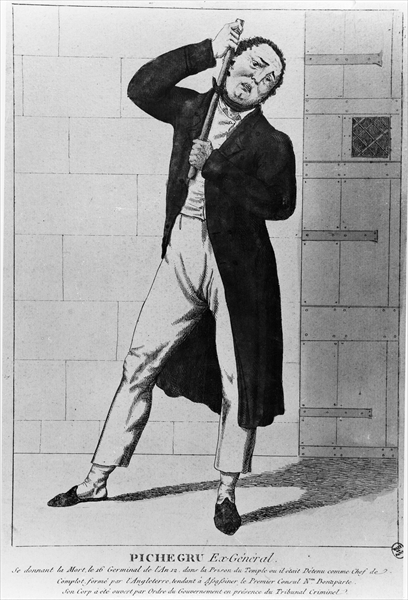
General Charles Pichegru strangling himself in the Temple Prison (engraving)

Cadoudal wanted to overthrow Napoleon and put the Bourbon heir Louis XVIII on the French throne. He was supported by Jean Pichegru, a general of the Revolutionary Wars who had been exiled from France. The Count of Artois (Louis XVIII's brother and the future Charles X of France) also gave his blessing to the plan. In August 1803, Cadoudal and other conspirators left London, landed near Dieppe, and travelled to Paris. Their aim was to assassinate Napoleon and pave the way for a Bourbon restoration. Though Pichegru claimed he had the full support of General Jean Moreau (a military rival of Napoleon), when the two met secretly in January 1804, it became clear that Moreau, a republican, would not support the Bourbons on the throne.

Around the same time that this was putting a dent in Cadoudal's plan, the French arrested a British secret agent who had participated in Cadoudal's landing. He revealed some details of the plot, including the involvement of Cadoudal and the two generals. Napoleon ordered their arrest. Moreau was picked up on February 15, Pichegru on February 26, and Cadoudal on March 9. Napoleon thought a minor Bourbon prince, the Duke of Enghien, was in league with the conspirators. He had him arrested on March 20 and executed early the next morning. On April 5, Pichegru was found strangled by his own tie in his prison cell. According to the police, it was a case of suicide.

Cadoudal, Moreau, and the other conspirators were brought to trial at the end of May. Cadoudal and 11 accomplices were executed on June 25, 1804. Moreau – for whom there was great popular sympathy – was sentenced to two years' imprisonment. Napoleon changed the sentence to exile in the United States. Moreau later returned to Europe to join the Coalition forces again Napoleon. He was fatally wounded in the Battle of Dresden in 1813.

== Friedrich Staps ==
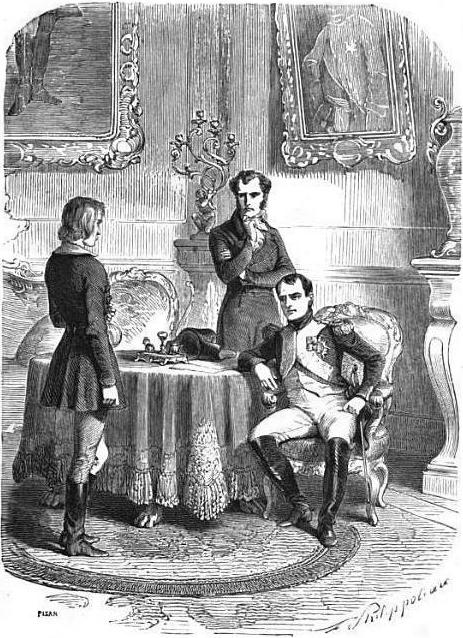
Interrogatoire de Staps par Napoléon (Interrogation of Staps by Napoleon)

In 1809, Napoleon and his troops occupied Vienna. On October 12 of that year, a German university student named Friedrich Staps attempted to assassinate Napoleon during a military parade at Schönbrunn Palace. Staps approached Napoleon on the pretense of presenting him with a petition. General Rapp became suspicious of the young man, whose right hand was thrust into a pocket under his coat. Staps was arrested and found to be carrying a large carving knife. When Rapp asked whether he had planned to assassinate Napoleon, Staps answered in the affirmative.

Napoleon wanted to speak to Staps directly, so the prisoner was brought to the Emperor's office with his hands tied behind his back. Using Rapp as an interpreter, Napoleon asked Staps a series of questions.

'Where were you born?' – 'In Naumburgh.'

'What is your father?' – 'A Protestant minister.'

'How old are you?' – 'I am eighteen years of age.'

'What did you intend to do with the knife?' – 'To kill you.'

'You are mad, young man; you are an illuminato.' – 'I am not mad; and I know not what is meant by an illuminato.'

'You are sick, then.' – 'I am not sick; on the contrary, I am in good health.'

'Why did you wish to assassinate me?' – 'Because you have caused the misfortunes of my country.'

'Have I done you any harm?' – 'You have done harm to me as well as to all Germans.'

'By whom were you sent? Who instigated you to this crime?' – 'Nobody. I determined to take your life from the conviction that I should thereby render the highest service to my country and to Europe.' ...

'I tell you, you are either mad or sick.' – 'Neither the one nor the other.'

After a doctor examined Staps and pronounced him in good health, Napoleon offered the young man a chance for clemency.

'You are a wild enthusiast,' said he; 'you will ruin your family. I am willing to grant your life, if you ask pardon for the crime which you intended to commit, and for which you ought to be sorry.' – 'I want no pardon,' replied Staps, 'I feel the deepest regret for not having executed my design.' 'You seem to think very lightly of the commission of a crime!' – 'To kill you would not have been a crime but a duty.' ... 'Would you not be grateful were I to pardon you?' – 'I would notwithstanding seize the first opportunity of taking your life.'

Staps was executed by firing squad on October 17, 1809. His last words were: "Liberty forever! Germany forever! Death to the tyrant!"
