= Napoleon's first abdication =

Abdication of April 1814

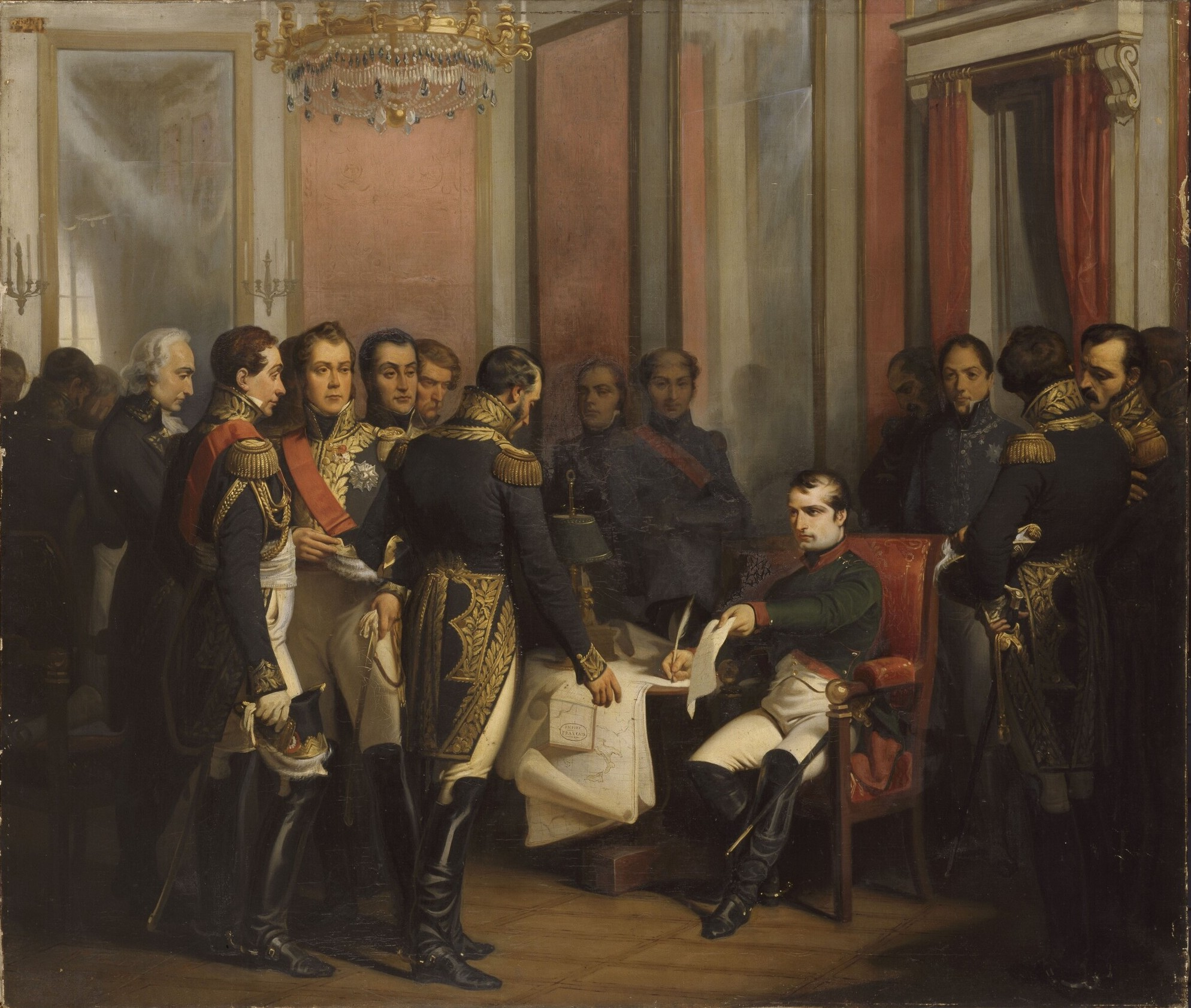
Napoleon Signing His Abdication at Fontainebleau by François Bouchot (1843).

Napoleon's first abdication was a moment in French history when, in April 1814, the French emperor Napoleon was forced to relinquish power following his military defeat in the French campaign and his allies' invasion.

== Military and political circumstances ==
Disagreeing with Tsar Alexander I of Russia over the future of Poland, Napoleon decided in 1812 to march against the Russian Empire. The Grande Armée crossed the River Neman in June and marched towards Moscow. To counter this aggression, a Sixth Coalition was formed between the United Kingdom of Great Britain and Ireland, the Russian Empire, the Kingdom of Prussia, and the Austrian Empire. Defeated by his adversaries and by harsh climate conditions, Napoleon was forced to make a retreat from Russia. Pushing their advantage against a weakened adversary, the coalition forced Napoleon to launch the German campaign in 1813. Victorious in the "Battle of the Nations" (Leipzig, October 1813), the Coalition armies set off for France on December 15.

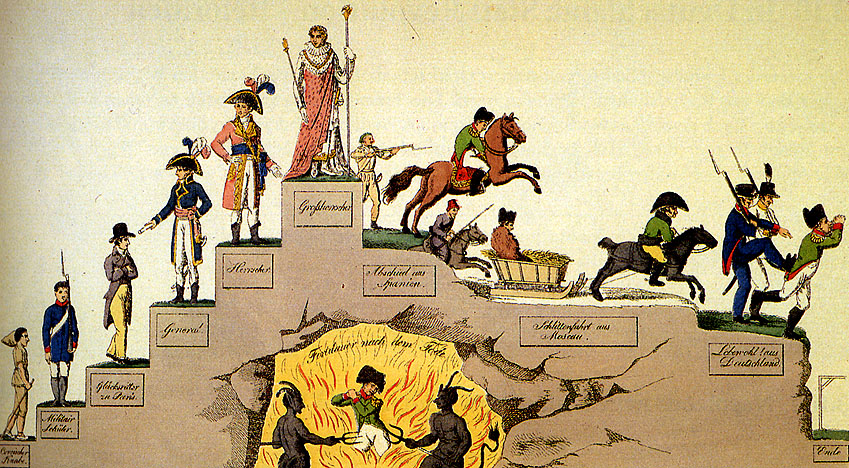
Napoleon's rise and fall, anonymous German cartoon, c. 1813.

To the south, on the Iberian front, the situation was not much better: the Pyrenees offensive, launched on July 25 under the command of Marshal Soult, ended on August 2 with the withdrawal of the French army from the region and the entry into France of the troops of Arthur Wellesley, Duke of Wellington. The French campaign also commenced at the same time.

Despite a series of victories (battles of Champaubert, Montmirail, etc.) won by Napoleon at the head of an army of young, inexperienced recruits (the "Marie-Louises"), Paris – which Empress Marie-Louise had left the day before – fell on March 31 after a day of fighting, while the Emperor awaited the Allies at Fontainebleau. He then instructed his grand squire Armand-Augustin-Louis de Caulaincourt to negotiate with Tsar Alexander I, who was staying with Charles Maurice de Talleyrand-Périgord on rue Saint-Florentin. Caulaincourt negotiated an abdication in favor of the King of Rome, Napoleon's 3-year-old son. The Tsar was not opposed, but on learning of the defection of Marshal Marmont, who had been placed in the vanguard at Essonnes, he imposed unconditional abdication on Napoleon, who was now in the open.

=== Treaty and legislative acts leading to Napoleon's destitution (April 3–12, 1814) ===
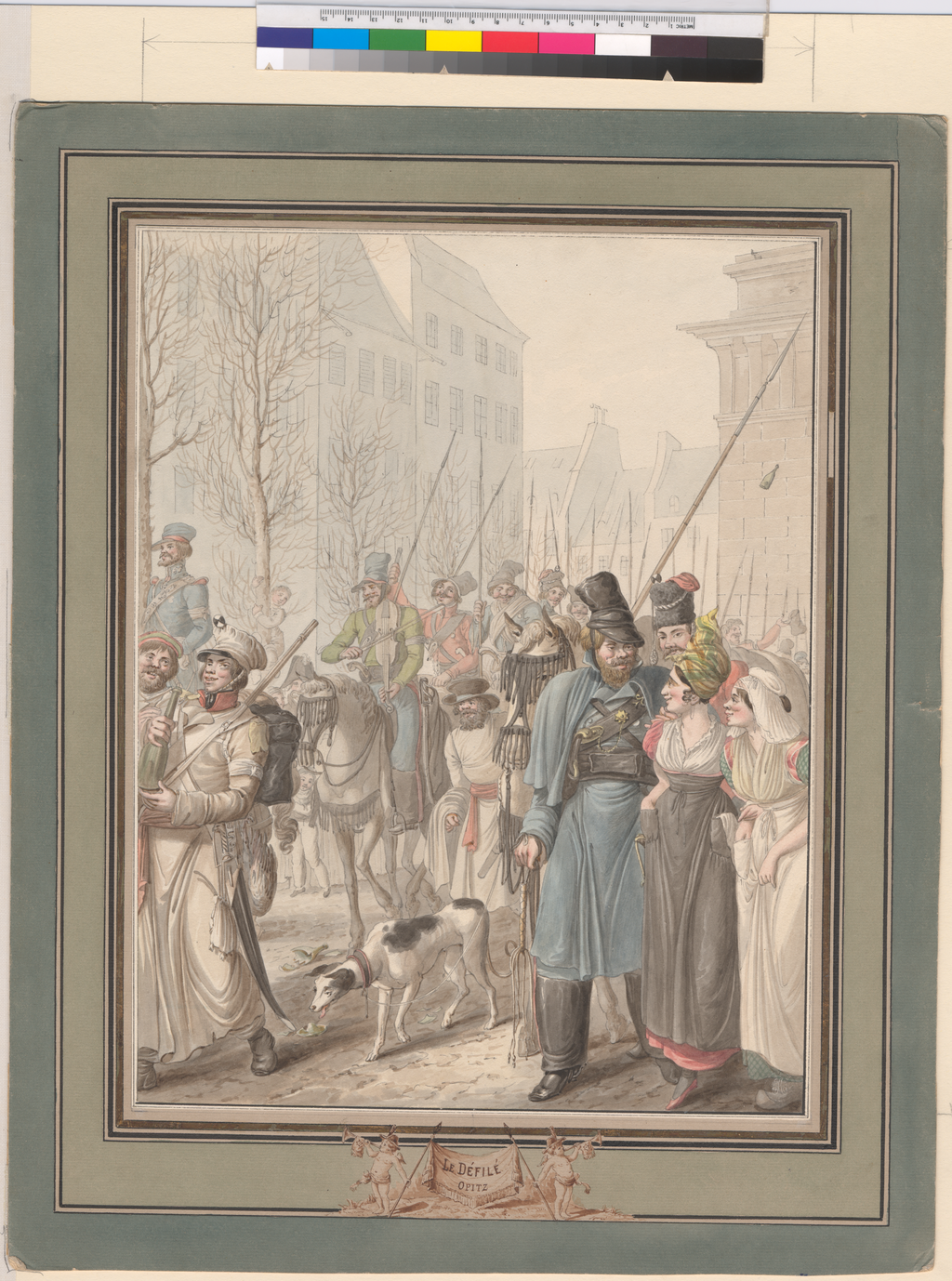
The Cossacks in Paris, cartoon by Opiz.

After his military defeat, the marshals forced the Emperor to abdicate. In order not to trigger a civil war, Napoleon gave in after unsuccessful attempts to rally them and was deposed by the Senate on April 3. Napoleon intended to relinquish the imperial crown to his son (Napoleon II), but the Allied powers demanded an unconditional abdication, which he signed on April 6, 1814.

The Senate named Louis-Stanislas-Xavier de Bourbon "King of the French, according to the wishes of the nation", under the name of Louis XVIII, and Napoleon was exiled.

As the Tsar had promised a settlement outside France worthy of Emperor Napoleon, he proposed Corsica to Caulaincourt, who refused, as it was an integral part of the French nation, and asked for Sardinia. Alexander I in turn rejected the proposal, as the island belonged to the House of Savoy. He chose the island of Elba, which before the Napoleonic Wars had partially belonged to the State of the Presidi. The Treaty of Fontainebleau of April 11, 1814, stipulated that Napoleon retain his title of Emperor, (Note: As Great Britain was not a signatory to the Treaty of Fontainebleau, it did not recognize Napoleon's title of Emperor, and this was the cause of the future conflict on St. Helena between him and his guardian Hudson Lowe, who considered him only a general.) and receives full sovereignty over Elba along with an annuity of 2 million francs from the French government.

== Suicide attempt ==
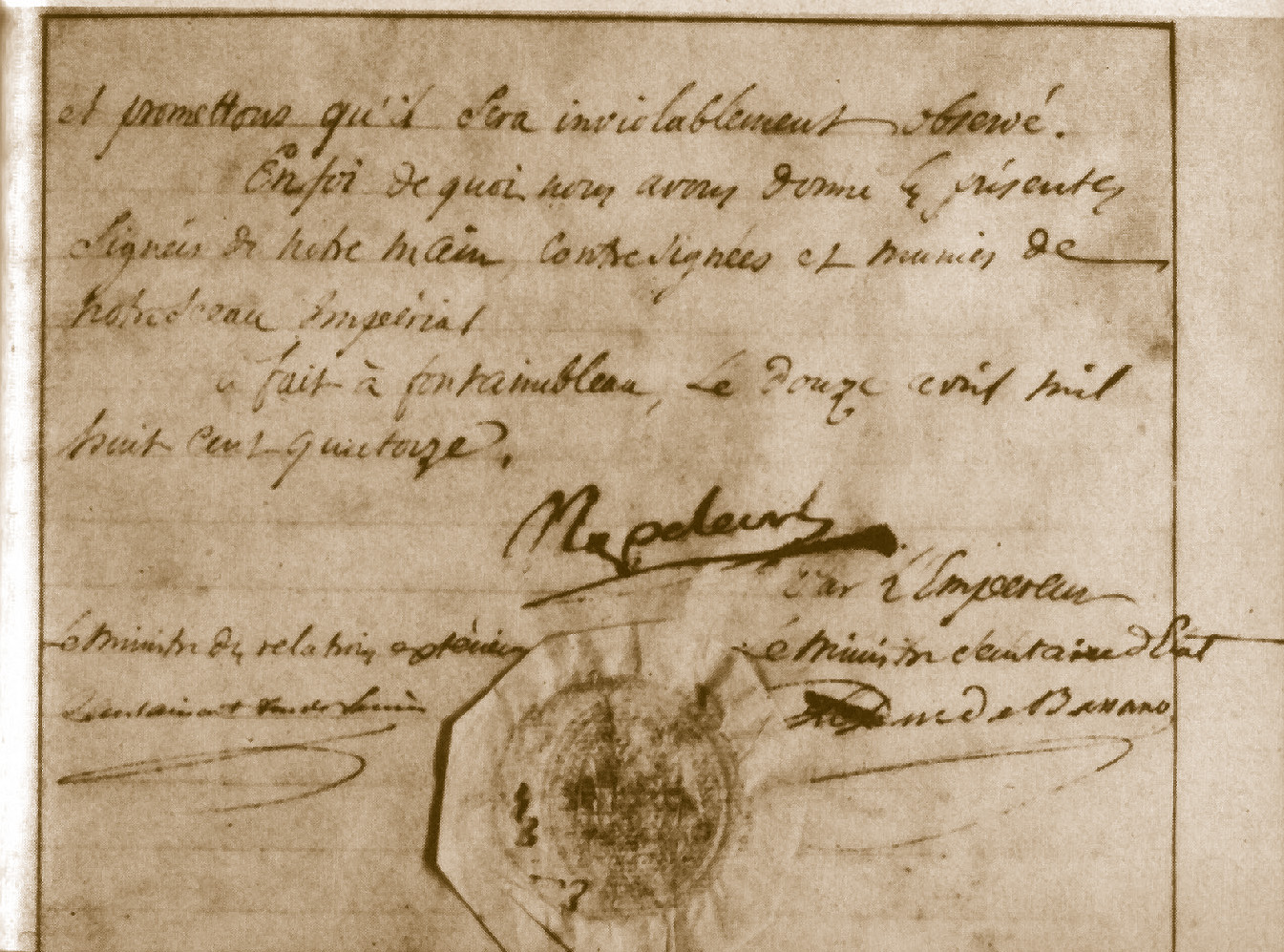
The first abdication, April 12, 1814, preserved in the Archives Nationales.

Napoleon, who believed that the Allies would separate him from Empress Marie-Louise of Austria and their son, the King of Rome, took a dose of "Condorcet's poison" on the night of April 12/13, which he hoped would be the means of committing suicide. For a long time, it was thought to be opium in a little water, with Dr. Hillemand believing that it was an accidental over-intake of opium to soothe abdominal pain. It would appear, however, that this was not the case, as Napoleon's condition and the nature of his discomfort were not consistent with opium intoxication. He called Armand de Caulaincourt to dictate his last wishes.

In the midst of his illness, the Emperor complained of the slow effect of the substance he had swallowed. He declared to Caulaincourt: "It's so hard to die, it's so unfortunate to have a constitution that postpones the end of a life that I can't wait to see the end!" Napoleon's nausea became increasingly violent, and he began to vomit. When Dr Alexandre-Urbain Yvan arrived, Napoleon asked for an extra dose of poison, but the doctor refused, saying that he was not a murderer and would never do anything against his conscience. The doctor himself had a nervous breakdown, fled on horseback, and was never seen again. As the Emperor's agony continued, Caulaincourt left the room to ask the chamber valet and the internal service to remain silent. Napoleon called Caulaincourt back, telling him he'd rather die than sign the treaty. The effects of the poison then wore off, and he was able to resume his normal activities. (Note: It is not known exactly how Bonaparte survived the dose of poison he ingested, and two hypotheses exist: either his stomach revulsed, which would explain the vomiting, or the poison had lost its strength.)

== Departure from France ==
=== Fontainebleau farewells ===
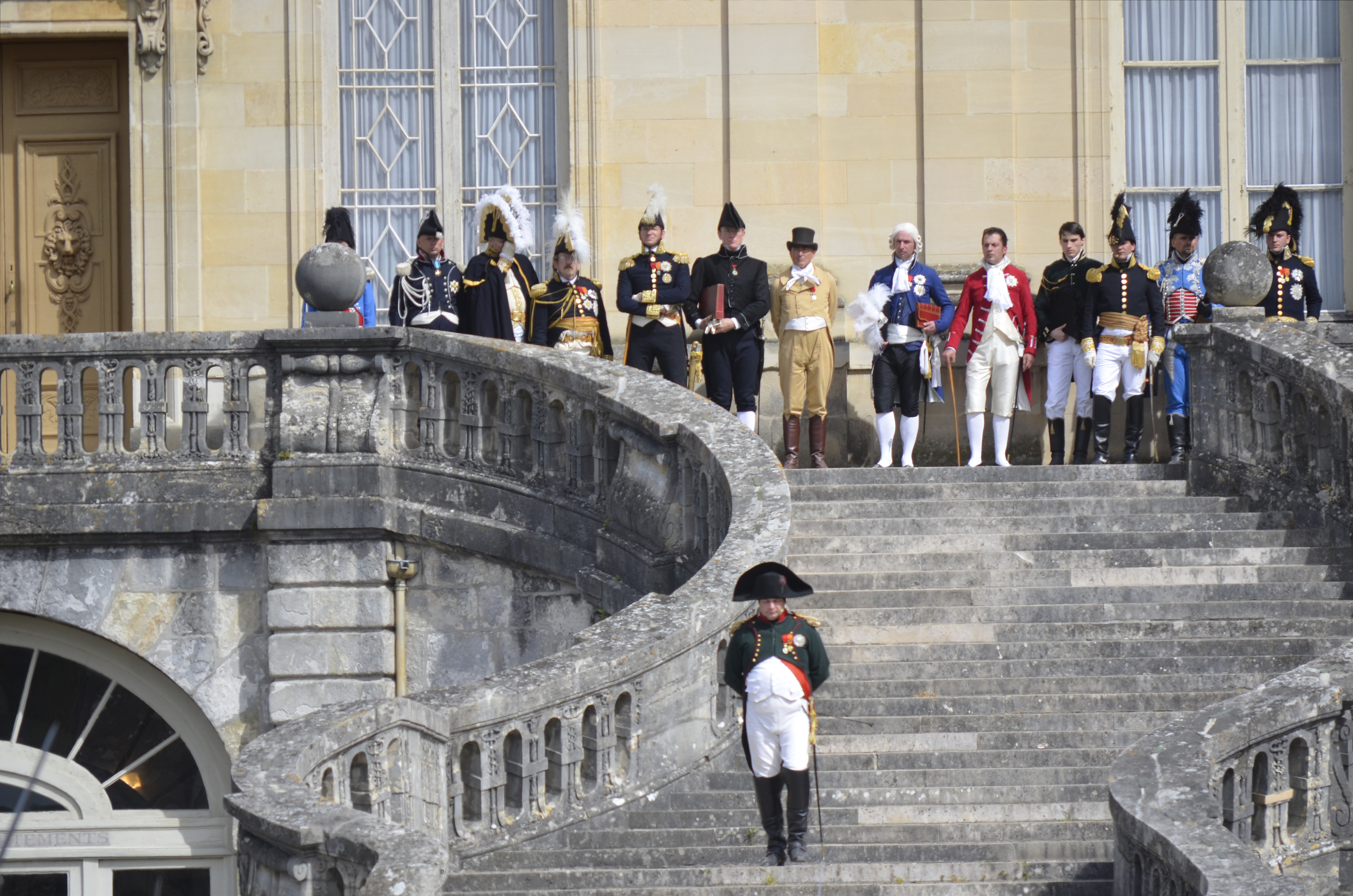
Celebration of the bicentenary of Napoleon's farewell to Fontainebleau in 2014, with a historical reconstruction of the First Abdication.

Soldiers of my old Guard, I bid you farewell. For twenty years, I have found you constantly on the path to honor and glory. In these last times, as in those of our prosperity, you have never ceased to be models of bravery and loyalty. With men like you, our cause was not lost. But the war was interminable; it would have been civil war, and France would only have become more miserable. So I sacrificed all our interests to those of the fatherland; I'm leaving. You, my friends, continue to serve France. Her happiness was my only thought; it will always be the object of my wishes! Do not pity my fate; if I have consented to survive, it is to continue to serve our glory; I want to write the great things we have done together! Farewell, my children! I would like to press you all to my heart; may I at least kiss your flag! Farewell once more, my old companions! May this last kiss pass through your hearts!

— Baron Fain, Manuscript of 1814

The "Fontainebleau Farewells" took place on April 20.

=== Route to exile ===
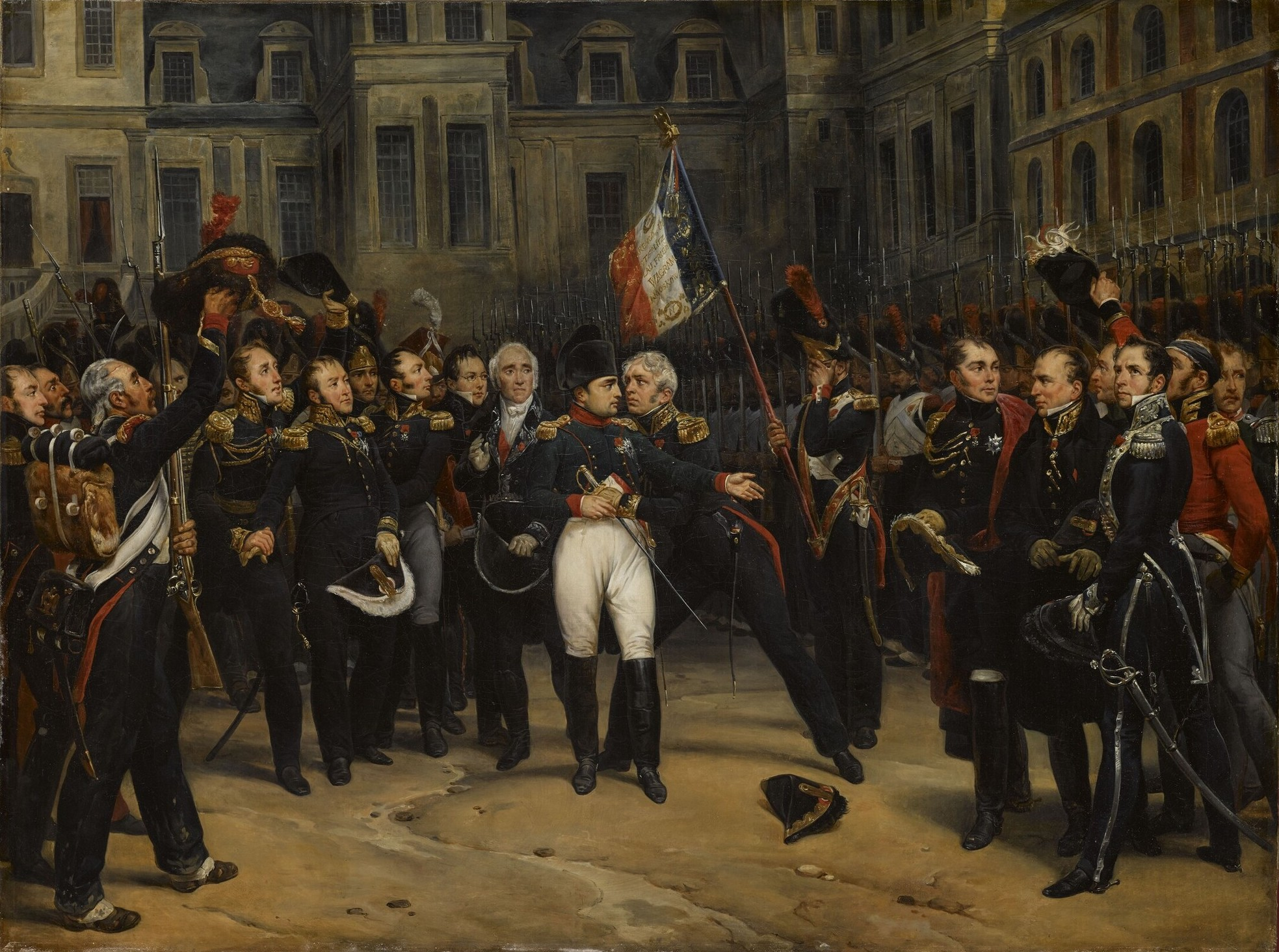
Napoleon bids farewell to the Imperial Guard in the Cheval-Blanc courtyard of the Château de Fontainebleau. Napoleon embraces General Petit (center). (Montfort)

His convoy from Fontainebleau to the Mediterranean passed through royalist Provençal villages, which booed him, before embarking for Elba. He even risked being lynched in Orgon, forcing him to disguise himself.

On April 18, 1814, Count Pierre Dupont de l'Étang, Louis XVIII's Minister of War, sent a letter to General Jean-Baptiste Dalesme, who governed Elba on behalf of the Grand Duchess of Tuscany, Elisa Bonaparte, informing him that he must hand over the territory to Napoleon. The Emperor left Saint-Raphaël on April 29, 1814, aboard the English frigate Undaunted, reached Portoferraio on May 3, 1814, and disembarked the following day. On the same day, Louis XVIII entered Paris.

Empress Marie-Louise initially offered to join her husband, but after meeting her father, Emperor Francis I of Austria, decided to travel to Vienna with her son.

== Political and military consequences ==
=== Military consequences ===
After his restoration, Louis XVIII quickly decided to reorganize the army. He confirmed General Dupont as Minister of War. A royal decree of May 6, 1814, set up a war council to reorganize the army. It was made up of Marshals Michel Ney, Charles-Pierre Augereau, and Étienne Macdonald, Minister Dupont, Generals Jean Dominique Compans and Philibert Jean-Baptiste Curial for the infantry, Victor de Fay de La Tour-Maubourg and Claude-Antoine-Hippolyte de Préval for the cavalry, Jean-Barthélemot Sorbier and Louis Évain for the artillery, François-Joseph Chaussegros de Léry for the engineers, François Étienne de Kellermann for the guard, Commissary Jean Gabriel Marchand and revenue inspector Félix.

The ordinance of May 12 reorganized the infantry, increasing the number of line infantry regiments to 90 and light infantry regiments to 15.

== Exile in Elba and return to France (Hundred Days) ==
Elba

It’s said whilst in exile on Elba, Napoleon was either depressed or anxious all day (due to increased threats of assassination). He became bored quickly, which led him to begin planning his escape soon after arriving on the island. Although he had no intention to stay, Napoleon ruled Elba well. He improved infrastructure on the islands and paved roads for movement of people and goods much quicker. The impoverished people of Elba quickly embraced their Emperor, and when he left, they threw him a celebration and wished him good luck.

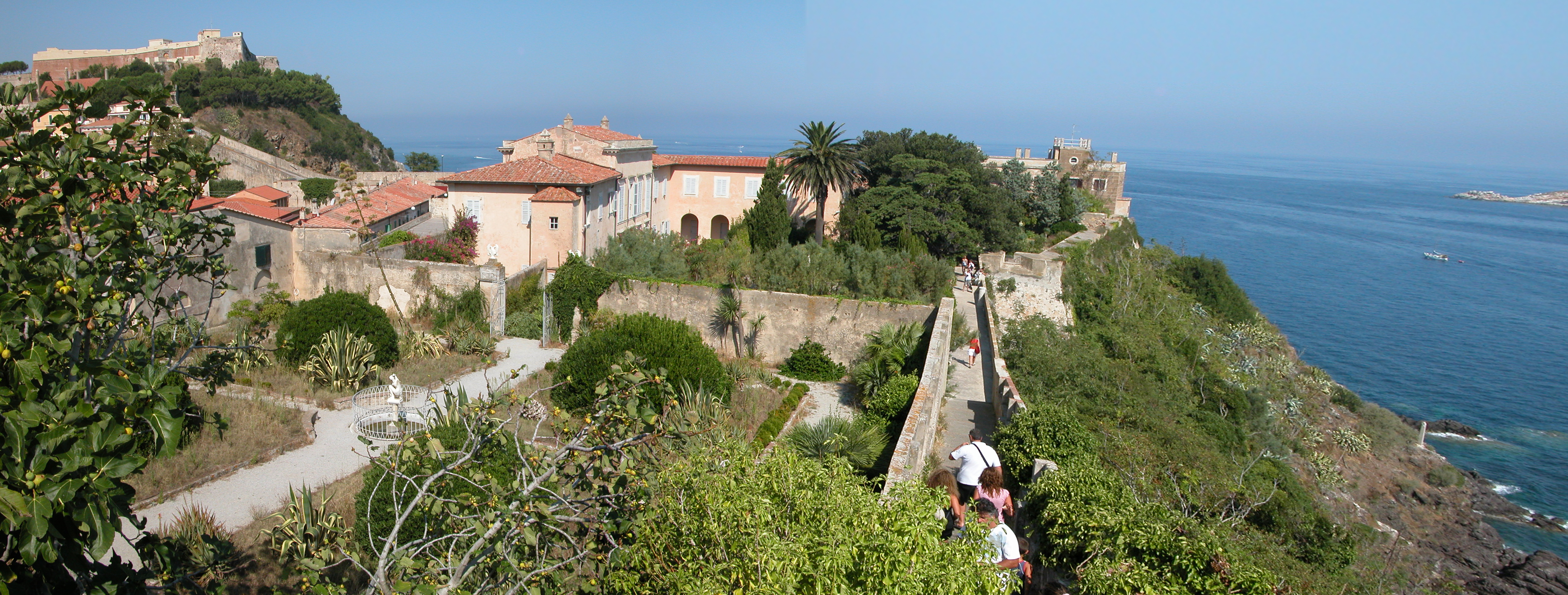
View of Napoleon's house (Palazzina dei Mulini) in Portoferraio, Elba.

=== "Operetta kingdom" ===
For three hundred days, from May 1814 to February 1815, Napoleon reigned over an “operetta kingdom” to which the Allies had exiled him after the French campaign. There, on Elba, the man who had dominated and ruled Europe behaved like a sovereign, meticulously regulating the government of a few square kilometers and a few thousand subjects. And he was so bored that plans to escape and return to France were soon on the agenda. Napoleon's plans were accelerated when it became clear that his former enemies and Louis XVIII's government were not fulfilling their commitments to him (particularly financial ones), and that there was talk of transferring him to a small island in the South Atlantic, St. Helena. The Emperor therefore decided to set out once again to reconquer his Empire, resuming contact with it for another hundred days.

— Guy Godlewski, Napoléon à l'île d'Elbe – 300 jours d'exil [Napoleon on Elba – 300 days of exile]

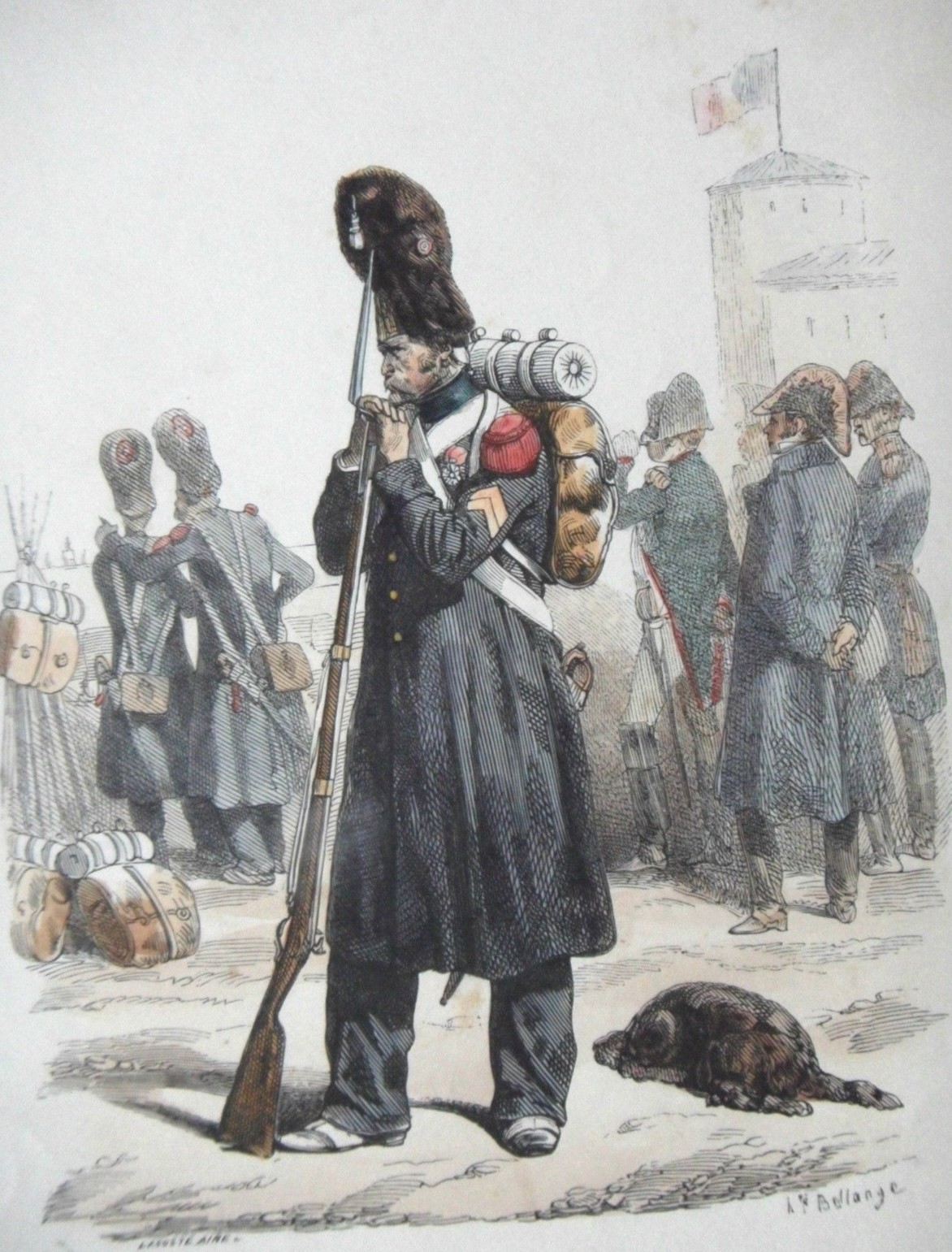

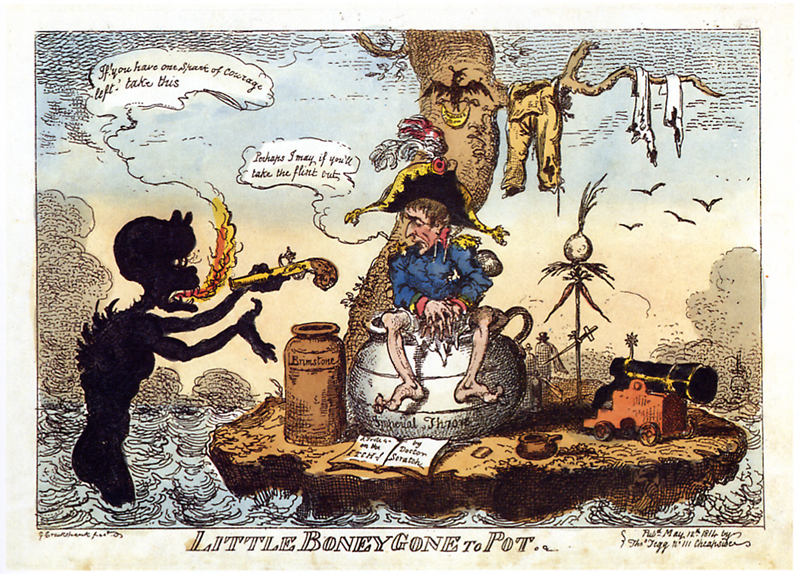
Cartoon depiction of Napoleon on Elba.

=== Last return to France ===
On March 1, 1815, the deposed Emperor disembarked at Vallauris at the head of the small troop that had followed him into exile. This marked the beginning of what history would remember as the "Hundred Days", which led to the formation of the Seventh Coalition that eventually defeated Napoleon at the Battle of Waterloo, resulting in his final abdication and exile to the island of St. Helena, where he died in May 1821.

== See also ==
- Napoleon
- Congress of Vienna
- Emperor of the French
- French Consulate
- War of the Sixth Coalition

== Bibliography ==
- Gruyer, Paul (1936). Napoléon, roi de l'île d'Elbe [Napoleon, King of Elba]. La Vivante Histoire (in French). Hachette Editions.
- Christophe, Robert (1959). Napoléon Empereur de l'île d'Elbe [Napoleon the Emperor of Elba] (in French). Arthème Fayard.
- Godlewski, Guy. Napoléon à l'île d'Elbe – 300 jours d'exil [Napoleon at Elba – 300 days of exile] (in French). Nouveau Monde.
- Lentz, Thierry (2014). Les vingt jours de Fontainebleau. La première abdication de Napoléon 31 mars–20 avril 1814 [The twenty days of Fontainebleau. Napoleon's first abdication March 31–April 20, 1814] (in French). Paris: Perrin.
