= Treaty of Fontainebleau (1814) =

Peace treaty exiling Napoleon to Elba

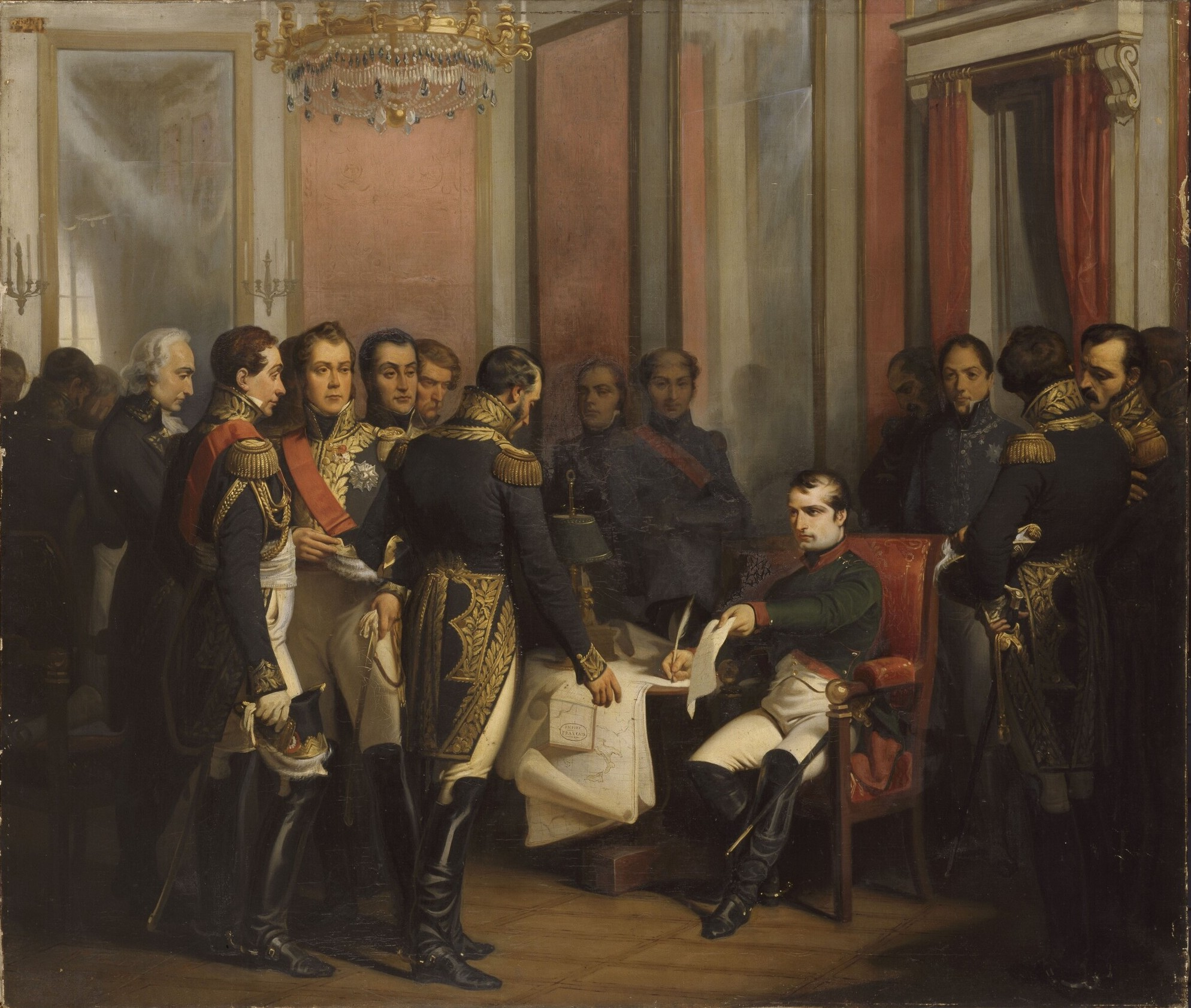
Napoleon Signing His Abdication at Fontainebleau, by François Bouchot and Gaetano Ferri (1843)

The Treaty of Fontainebleau was an agreement concluded in Fontainebleau, France, on 11 April 1814 between Napoleon and representatives of Austria, Russia and Prussia. The treaty was signed in Paris on 11 April by the plenipotentiaries of both sides and ratified by Napoleon on 13 April. With this treaty, the allies ended Napoleon's rule as emperor of the French and sent him into exile on Elba.

== Prelude ==
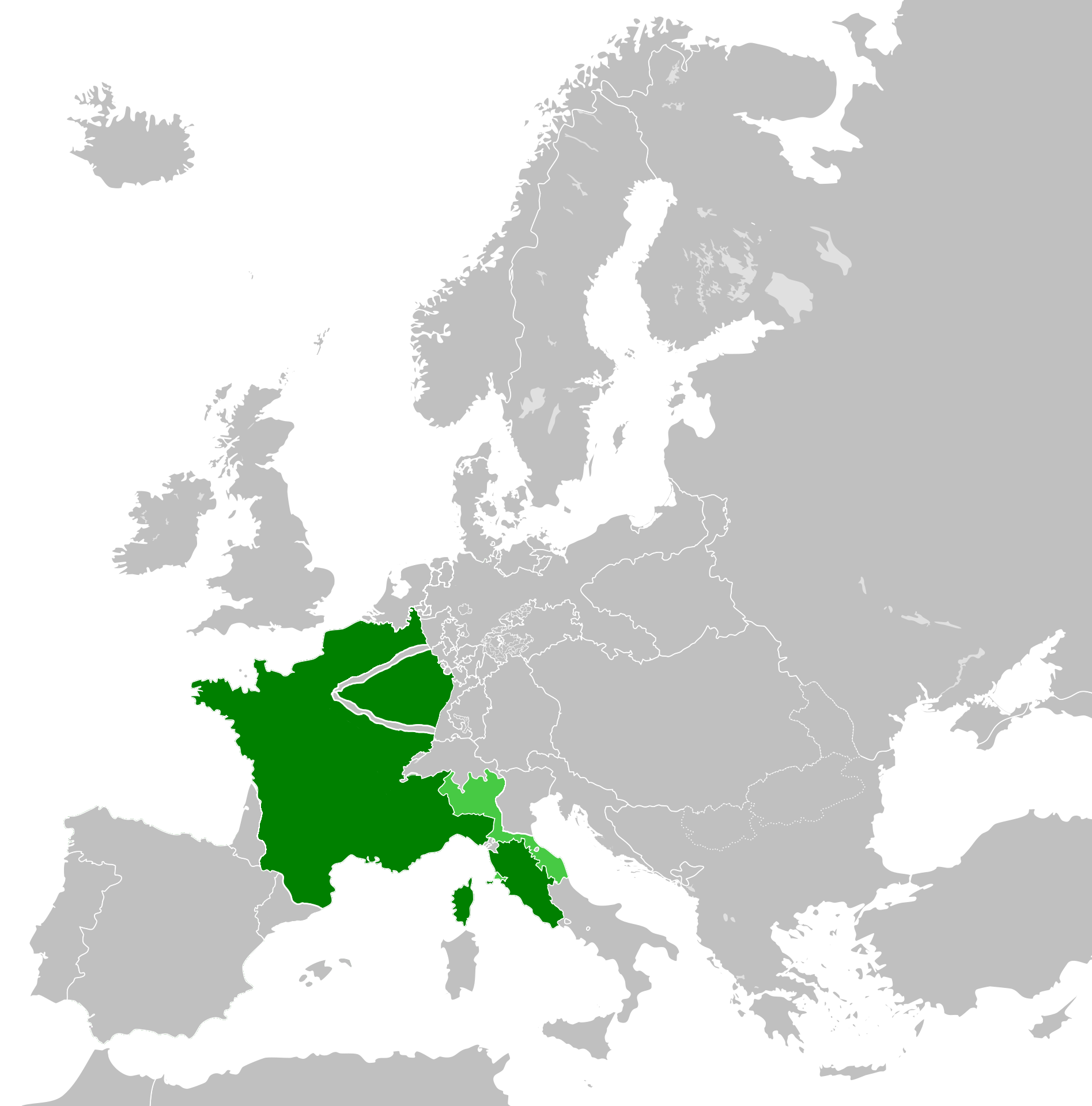
The French Empire on the eve of Napoleon’s abdication

In the War of the Sixth Coalition (1812–1814), a coalition of Austria, Prussia, Russia, Sweden, the United Kingdom and a number of German states drove Napoleon out of Germany in 1813. In 1814, while the United Kingdom, Spain and Portugal invaded France across the Pyrenees; Russia, Austria and their allies invaded France across the Rhine and, after the Battle of Paris, entered into negotiations with members of the French government for the abdication of Napoleon.

On 31 March, the Coalition issued a declaration to the French nation:

The allied powers having occupied Paris, they are ready to receive the declaration of the French nation. They declare, that if it was indispensable that the conditions of peace should contain stronger guarantees when it was necessary to enchain the ambition of Napoleon, they would become more favourable when, by a return to a wiser government, France itself offers the assurance of repose. The allied sovereigns declare, in consequence, that they will no longer treat with Napoleon nor with any of his family; that they respect the integrity of old France, as it existed under its legitimate kings—they may even go further, for they always profess the principle, that for the happiness of Europe it is necessary that France should be great and powerful; that they recognise and will guarantee such a constitution as the French nation may give itself. They invite, consequently, the senate to appoint a provisional government, which may provide for the necessities of administration, and establish such a constitution as may be fitting for the French people. The intentions which I have just expressed are common to me with all the allied powers. Alexander, Paris, 31st March 1814 : Three P.M.

On 1 April, Russian Emperor Alexander I addressed the French Sénat conservateur in person and laid out similar terms as were in the previous day's declaration. As a gesture of good will, he announced that 150,000 French prisoners of war who had been held by the Russians since the French invasion of Russia, two years earlier, would be released immediately. The next day, the Senate agreed to the Coalition's terms and passed the Acte de déchéance de l'Empereur, which dethroned Napoleon and his family. They also passed a decree dated 5 April, justifying their actions, and ending:

...the senate declares and decrees as follows :—1. Napoleon Buonaparte is cast down from the throne, and the right of succession in his family is abolished. 2. The French people and army are absolved from their oath of fidelity to him. 3. The present decree shall be transmitted to the departments and armies, and proclaimed immediately in all the quarters of the capital.

On 3 April 1814, word reached Napoleon, who was at the Palace of Fontainebleau, that the French Senate had dethroned him. As the Coalition forces had made public their position that their quarrel was with Napoleon and not the French people, he called their bluff and abdicated in favour of his son, with the Empress Marie-Louise as regent.

Three plenipotentiaries took this conditional abdication to the Coalition sovereigns:

The allied powers having proclaimed that the Emperor Napoleon is the sole obstacle to the re-establishment of peace in Europe, – the Emperor Napoleon, faithful to his oath, declares that he is ready to descend from the throne, to quit France, and even life itself, for the good of the country, which is inseparable from the rights of his son, of the regency of the Empress, and of the maintenance of the laws of the empire.

— Napoleon: Fontainebleau, 4 April 1814

While the plenipotentiaries were travelling to deliver their message, Napoleon heard that Auguste Marmont had placed his corps in a hopeless position and that their surrender was inevitable. The Coalition sovereigns were in no mood to compromise and rejected Napoleon's offer. Emperor Alexander stated:

A regency with the Empress and her son, sounds well, I admit; but Napoleon remains – there is the difficulty. In vain will he promise to remain quiet in the retreat which will be assigned to him. You know even better than I his devouring activity, his ambition. Some fine morning he will put himself at the head of the regency, or in its place: then the war will recommence, and all Europe will be on fire. The very dread of such an occurrence will oblige the Allies to keep their armies on foot, and thus frustrate all their intentions in making peace.

With the rejection of his conditional abdication and no military option left to him, Napoleon bowed to the inevitable:

The allied powers having declared that the Emperor Napoleon is the sole obstacle to the re-establishment of a general peace in Europe, the Emperor Napoleon, faithful to his oath, declares that he renounces, for himself and his heirs the throne of France and Italy; and that there is no personal sacrifice, not even that of life itself, which he is not willing to make for the interests of France.

— Napoleon: Fontainebleau, 6 April 1814

Over the next few days, with Napoleon's reign over France now at an end, the formal treaty was negotiated and signed by the plenipotentiaries in Paris on 11 April and ratified by Napoleon on 13 April.

== Terms ==
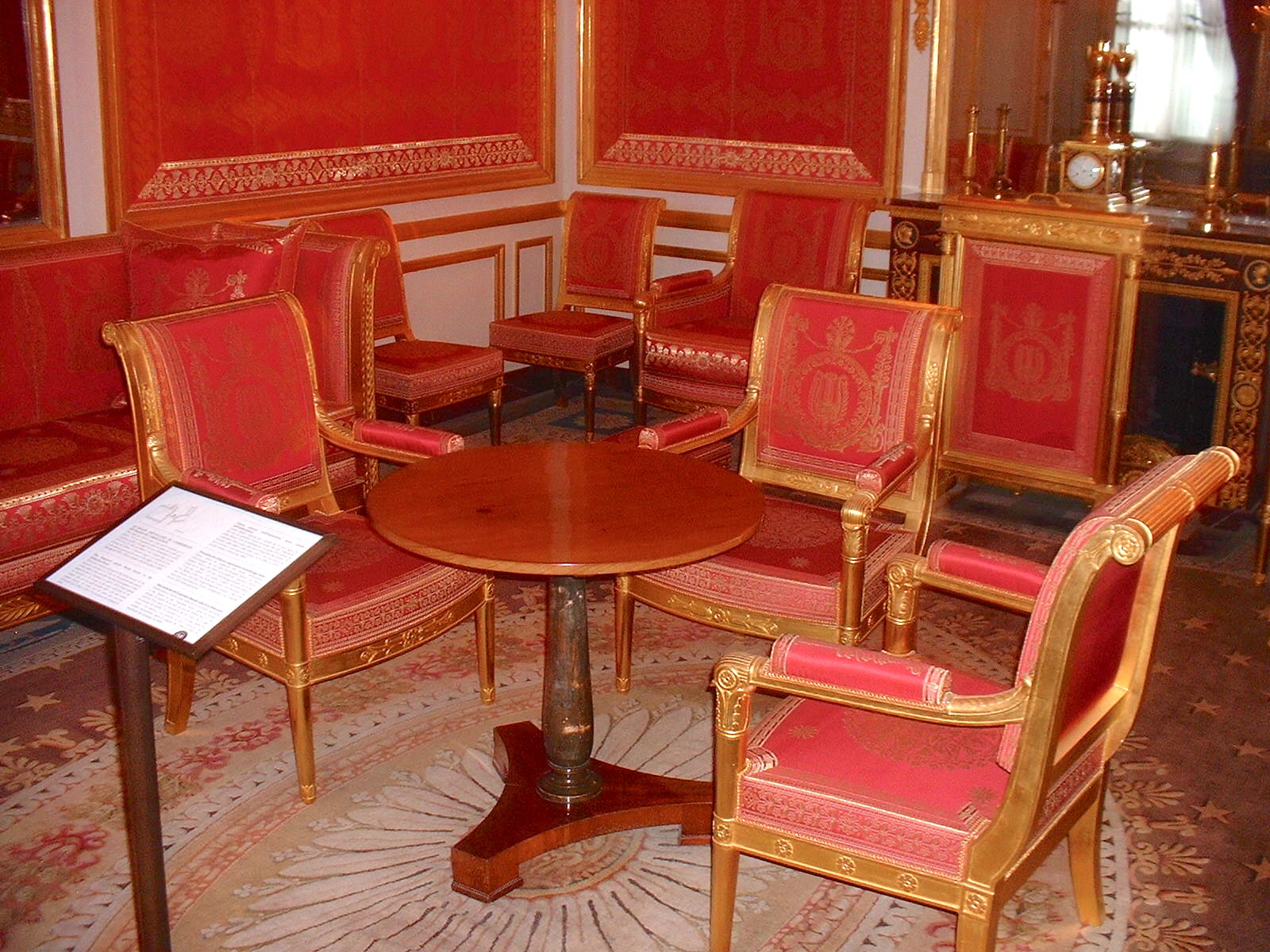
Room at the Fontainebleau where the Treaty was signed

The agreement contained a total of 21 articles. By the most significant terms of the accord, Napoleon was stripped of his powers as ruler of the French Empire, but both Napoleon and Marie-Louise were permitted to preserve their respective titles as emperor and empress. Moreover, all of Napoleon's successors and family members were prohibited from attaining power in France.

The treaty also established the island of Elba as a separate principality to be ruled by Napoleon. Elba's sovereignty and flag were guaranteed recognition by foreign powers in the accord, but only France was allowed to assimilate the island.

In another tenet of the agreement, the Duchy of Parma and Piacenza and the Duchy of Guastalla were ceded to Empress Marie-Louise. Moreover, a direct male descendant of Empress Marie-Louise would be known as the Prince of Parma, Piacenza, and Guastalla. In other parts of the treaty, Empress Josephine's annual income was reduced to 1,000,000 francs and Napoleon had to surrender all of his estates in France to the French crown, and submit all crown jewels to France. He was permitted to take with him 400 men to serve as his personal guard.

The signatories were Caulaincourt, Duke of Vicenza, Marshal MacDonald, Duke of Tarentum, Marshal Ney, Duke of Elchingen, Prince Metternich, Count Nesselrode, and Baron Hardenberg.

== British opposition ==
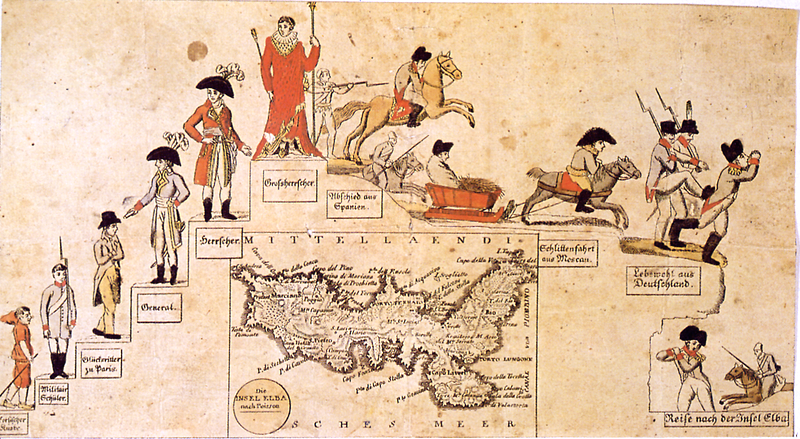
"The Rise and Fall of Napoleon", a cartoon drawn by Johann Michael Voltz following the Treaty of Fontainebleau; on the lower side is seen the map of Elba.

The British position was that the French nation was in a state of rebellion and that Napoleon was a usurper. Castlereagh explained that he would not sign on behalf of the king of the United Kingdom because to do so would recognise the legitimacy of Napoleon as emperor of the French and that to exile him to an island over which he had sovereignty, only a short distance from France and Italy, both of which had strong Jacobin factions, could easily lead to further conflict.

== Theft of document ==
In 2005, two Americans, former history professor John William Rooney (then aged 74) and Marshall Lawrence Pierce (then aged 44), were charged by a French court for stealing a copy of the Treaty of Fontainebleau from the French National Archives between 1974 and 1988. The theft came to light in 1996, when a curator of the French National Archives discovered that Pierce had put the document up for sale at Sotheby's. Rooney and Pierce pleaded guilty in the United States and were fined ($1,000 for Rooney and $10,000 for Pierce). However, they were not extradited to France to stand trial there. The copy of the treaty and a number of other documents (including letters from King Louis XVIII) that were checked out from the French National Archives by Rooney and Pierce were returned to France by the United States in 2002.

== See also ==
- Treaty of Chaumont (1814) – a rejected cease-fire offered by the Sixth Coalition
- Treaty of Paris (1814) – peace treaty at the end of the Wars of the Sixth Coalition
- Convention of St. Cloud (1815) – surrender of Paris at the end of the Waterloo Campaign
- Treaty of Paris (1815) – peace treaty after the Waterloo Campaign
