= Napoleon Signing His Abdication at Fontainebleau =

Painting by François Bouchot

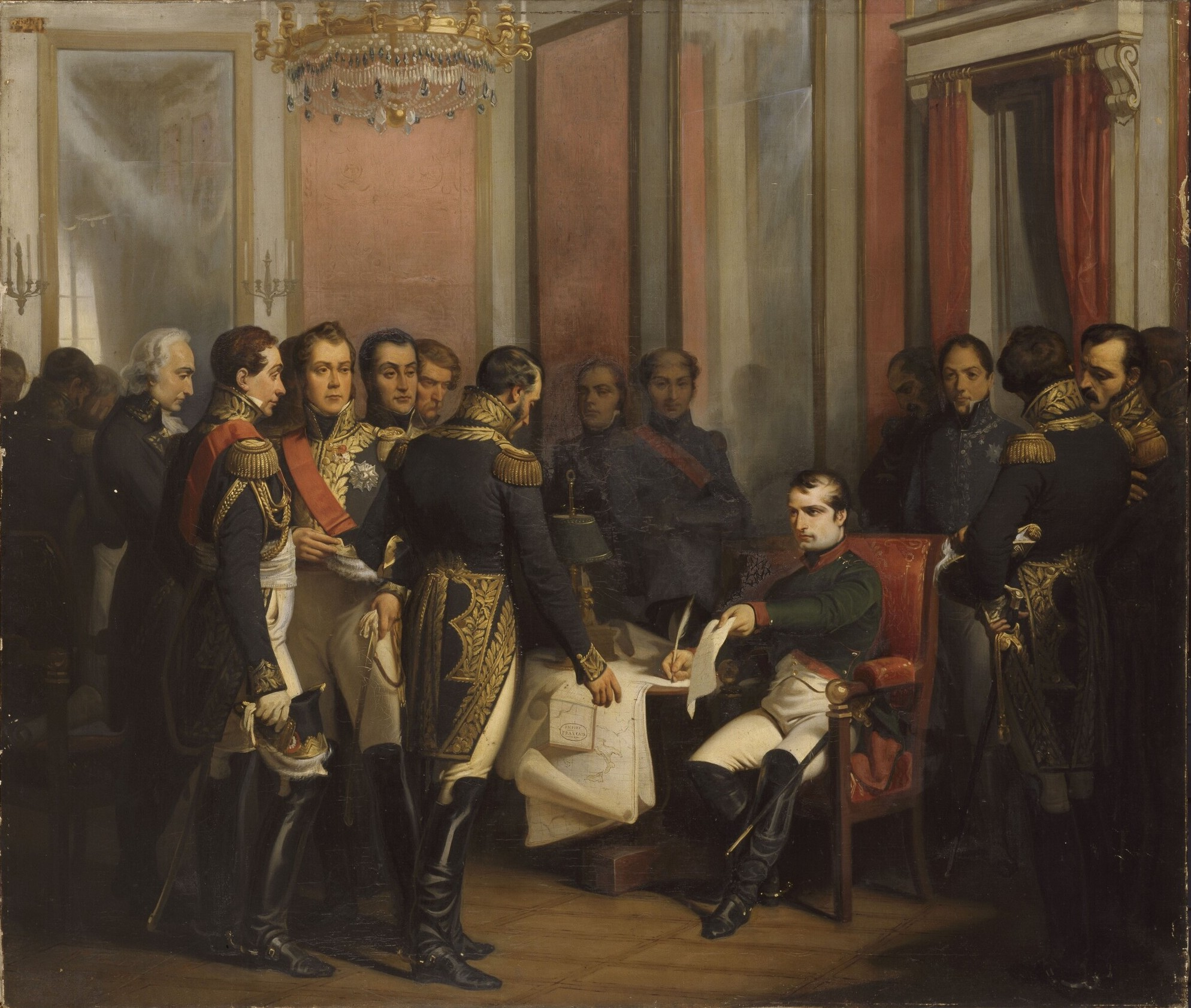
- Artist: François Bouchot
- Year: 1843
- Type: Oil on canvas, history painting
- Dimensions: 136 cm × 160.5 cm (54 in × 63.2 in)
- Location: Palace of Versailles; Versailles

Napoleon Signing His Abdication at Fontainebleau (French: Napoléon signe son abdication à Fontainebleau) is an 1843 history painting by the French artist François Bouchot, completed by Gaetano Ferri. It portrays the moment Napoleon formally signed the formal document of abdication at Palace of Fontainebleau on 11 April 1814. The Treaty of Fontainebleau ended the War of the Sixth Coalition, the penultimate stage of the Napoleonic Wars. The following year Napoleon escaped from Elba leading to his final defeat during the Hundred Days campaign. He is depicted surrounded by many of his top advisors and generals including Marshal Berthier, Marshal Ney, Marshal Macdonald, Marshal Oudinot and the Foreign Minister Armand-Augustin-Louis de Caulaincourt.

The painting was commissioned in 1840 by the government for 2,400 francs. Under the July Monarchy of Louis Philippe I, a large number of paintings were produced depicting scenes from recent French history. Ferri completed the work after the death of Bouchot in February 1842, for an additional sum of 1,400 francs. The picture was displayed at the Salon of 1843 held at the Louvre in Paris before it was transferred to the collection of the Museum of French History at the Palace of Versailles.

== Bibliography ==
- Cantarel-Besson, Yveline, Constans, Claire & Foucart, Bruno. Napoléon: images et histoire : peintures du Château de Versailles, 1789-1815. Réunion des musées nationaux, 2001.
- Lagrange, Marion. Les peintres italiens en quête d'identité: Paris 1855-1909. CTHS, 2010.
