= The Battle of Zurich =

Painting by François Bouchot

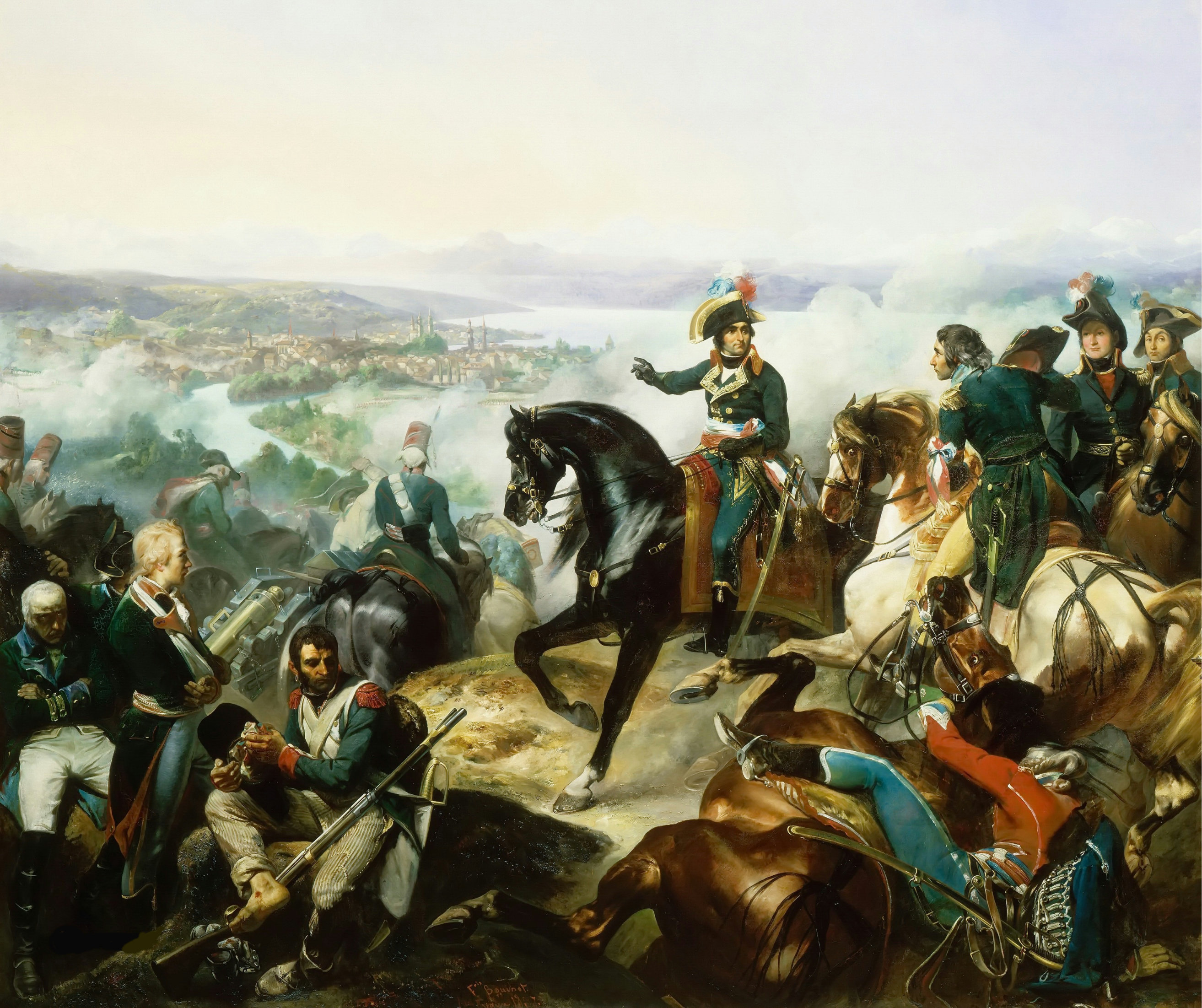
- Artist: François Bouchot
- Year: 1835
- Medium: Oil on canvas
- Dimensions: 465 cm × 543 cm (183 in × 214 in)
- Location: Palace of Versailles, Versailles

The Battle of Zurich is an 1835 history painting by the French artist François Bouchot. It depicts the Second Battle of Zurich fought in September 1799 during the French Revolutionary Wars, a decisive victory for the French Republic over the Russian Empire. The French commander André Masséna is prominently featured on horseback.

It was part of a series of epic battle paintings commissioned at the cost of 12,000 francs by the French state during the July Monarchy for the Galerie des Batailles in the Musée de l'Histoire de France of the Palace of Versailles. It was displayed at the Salon of 1837 held at the Louvre in Paris.

== Bibliography ==
- Hornstein, Katie. Picturing War in France, 1792–1856. Yale University Press, 2018.
- Olsen, Roberta J.M. Italian 19th Century: Drawings & Watercolors. Shepherd Gallery, 1976.
