= Louis Constant Wairy =

French valet

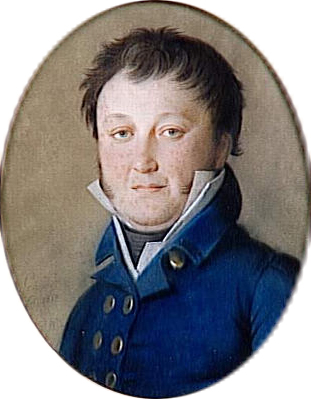
Portrait of Louis Constant Wairy (1813)

Louis Constant Wairy (1778–1845) was valet to Napoleon, Emperor of the French.

He wrote "Mémoires de Constant, premier valet de chambre de l'empereur, sur la vie privée de Napoléon, sa famille et sa cour." ("Memoires of Constant, valet of the emperor; about his private life, his family and his court.") His memoirs were also translated into English.
