= Bonaparte at the Council of Five Hundred at Saint-Cloud =

Painting by François Bouchot

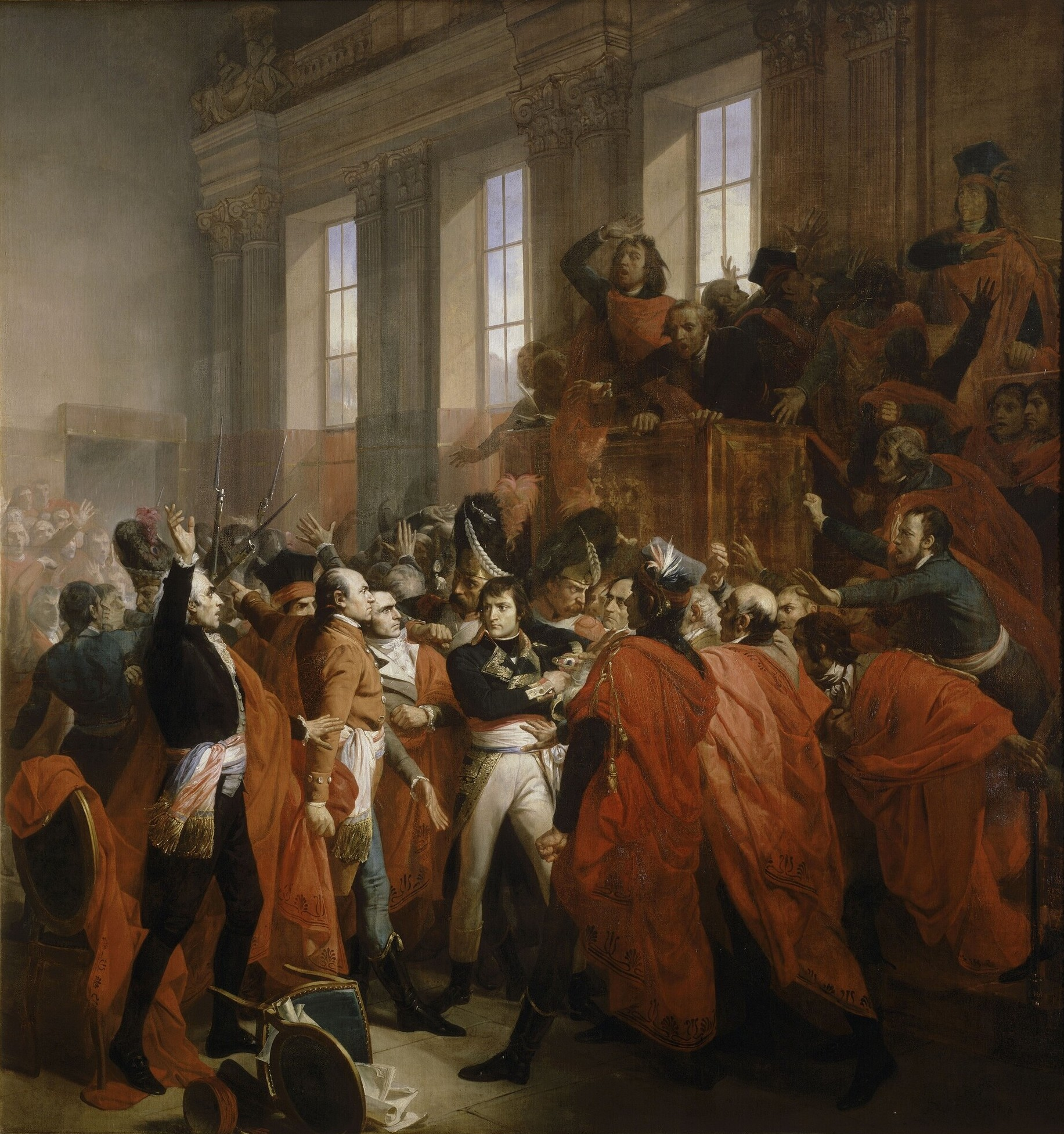
- Artist: François Bouchot
- Year: 1840
- Type: Oil on canvas, history painting
- Dimensions: 421 cm × 401 cm (166 in × 158 in)
- Location: Palace of Versailles; Versailles

Bonaparte at the Council of Five Hundred at Saint-Cloud (French: Le général Bonaparte au conseil des Cinq-Cents, à Saint-Cloud) is an oil on canvas history painting by the French artist François Bouchot, from 1840.

== History and description ==
It depicts a key moment in the Coup of 18 Brumaire when Napoleon Bonaparte seized power from the French Directory in 1799 and had himself proclaimed First Consul. He is shown at the orangery of the Château de Saint-Cloud, surrounded by Grenadiers of the French Army and outraged members of the Council of Five Hundred. The scene depicts a moment of turmoil with the outcome of the coup still uncertain. It features portrayals of Joachim Murat and Lucien Bonaparte, then President of the Council, both of whom were key participants in the takeover.

The picture was commissioned in 1837 by the French state during the July Monarchy of Louis Philippe I for the sum of 9,000 Francs, part of a wider scheme to glorify French history and the Napoleonic era in particular. The work was completed the year that the remains of Napoleon were returned to France from British territory. The painting was displayed at the Salon of 1840 held at the Louvre in Paris before being transferred to the Museum of French History at the Palace of Versailles. It also was displayed at the Exposition Universelle in 1889.

== Bibliography ==
- Best, Janice. Power and Propaganda in French Second Empire Theatre: Playing Napoleon. Cambridge Scholars Publishing, 2023.
- Cantarel-Besson, Yveline, Constans, Claire & Foucart, Bruno. Napoléon: images et histoire : peintures du Château de Versailles, 1789-1815. Réunion des musées nationaux, 2001.
