= François Bouchot =

French painter (1800–1842)

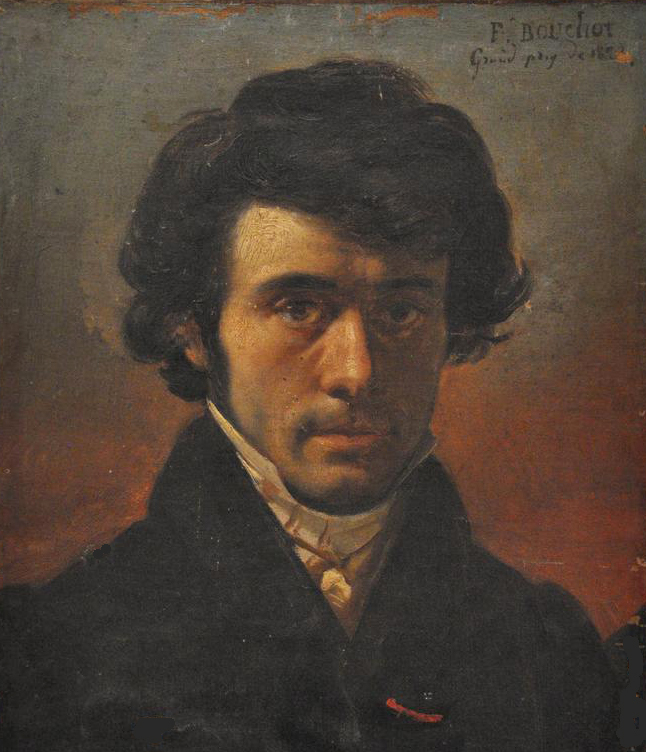
- Possible self-portrait (1824-1831)
- Born: 29 November 1800; Paris, France
- Died: 7 February 1842 (aged 41); Paris, France

François Bouchot (French pronunciation: [fʁɑ̃swa buʃo]; 29 November 1800 – 7 February 1842) was a French painter and engraver.

== Biography ==
He studied at the École des beaux-arts de Paris. His primary instructors there were Jean-Baptiste Regnault and Jules Richomme. He also frequented the studios of Guillaume Guillon-Lethière on the Rue Childebert.

In 1822, he came in second at the Prix de Rome. He won the following year and arrived at the French Academy in Rome in 1824. That same year, he sent his first painting back to France, where it was exhibited at the Salon of 1824. He would remain in Italy for seven years.

Back in France, he was named a Knight of the Legion of Honor in 1835. Over the next few years, he executed several commissions from King Louis-Philippe, including scenes from the Second Battle of Zurich and the Coup of 18 Brumaire. The latter was given a special display at the Salon of 1840, on the occasion of Napoleon's ashes being returned to France. After being at the Louvre for many years, it is now at Versailles.

Sometime in the late 1830s, he married Francesca Lablache (1816-1901). daughter of the comic opera singer Luigi Lablache, whose portrait he had painted. They had no children. Shortly before his death, she left him to join her lover, the German painter Henri Lehmann, in Italy. A year later, she married the pianist Sigismond Thalberg.

He was preparing to paint murals for a new chapel at Luxembourg Palace, when he died suddenly. The cause of his death was apparently not recorded and what, if any, relationship it may have had to his wife's affair is unknown. His final work Napoleon Signing His Abdication at Fontainebleau was completed by Gaetano Ferri.

== Selected works ==
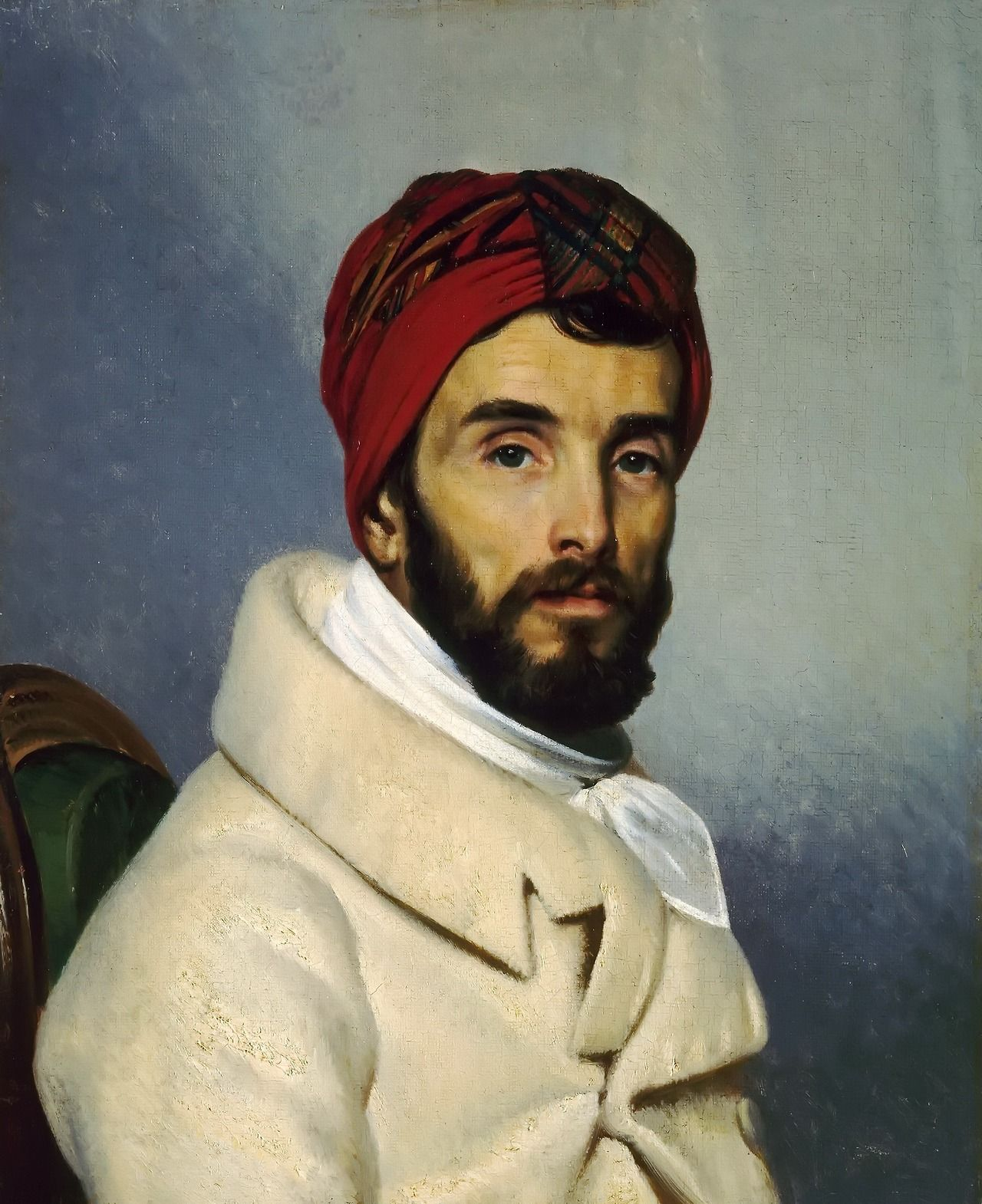
Portrait of Pierre-Narcisse Guérin, 1830

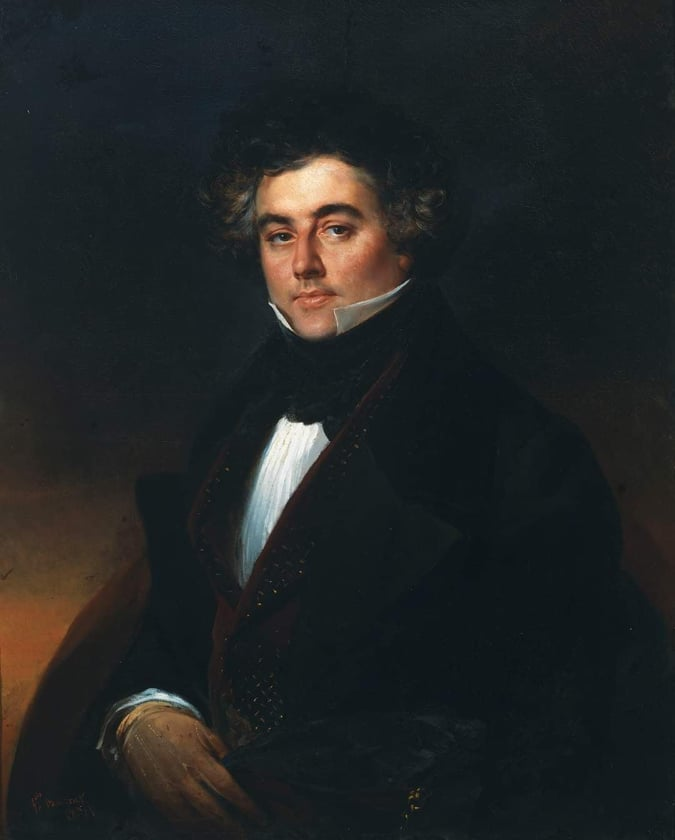
Portrait of Luigi Lablache, 1831

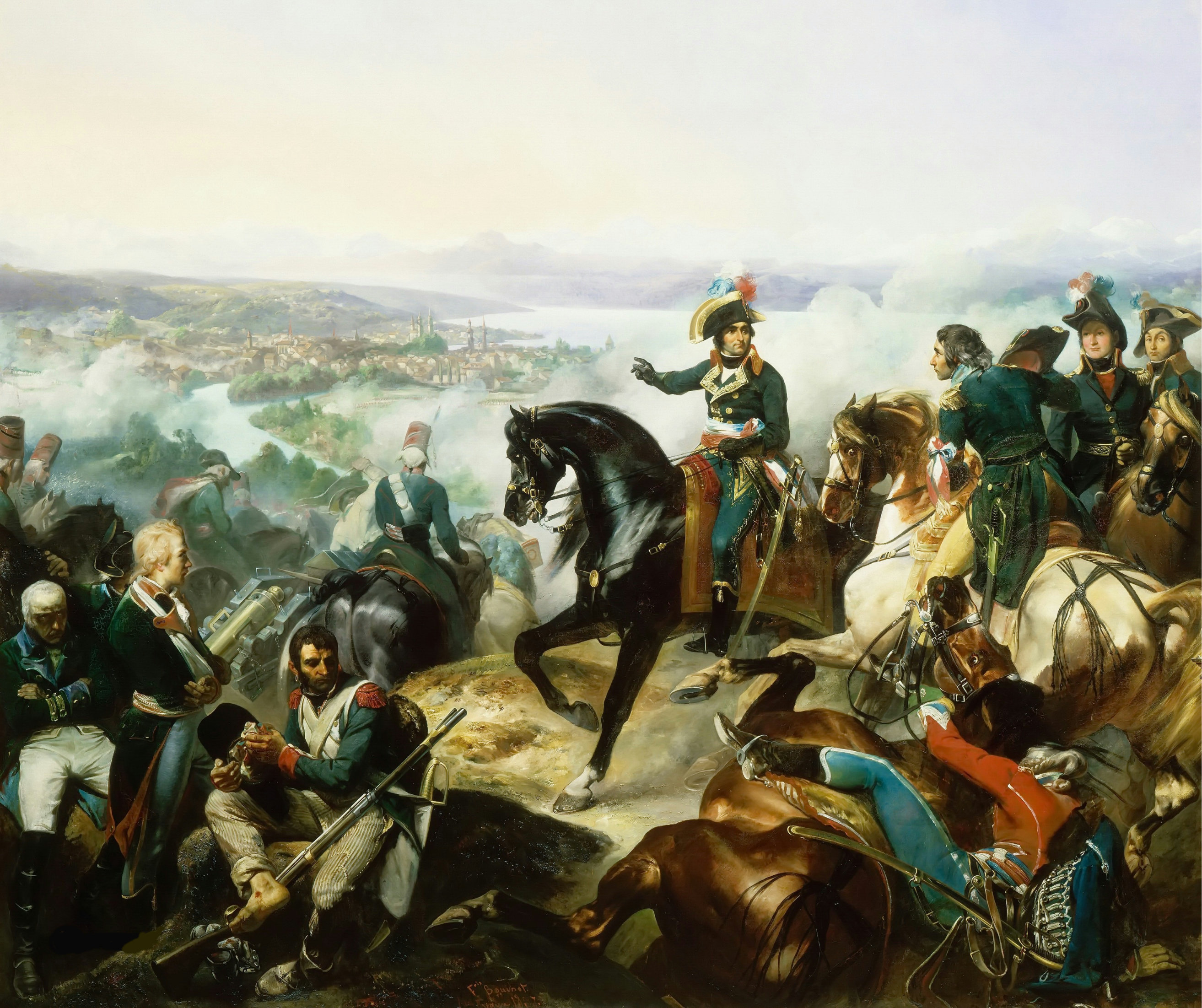
The Battle of Zurich, 1835

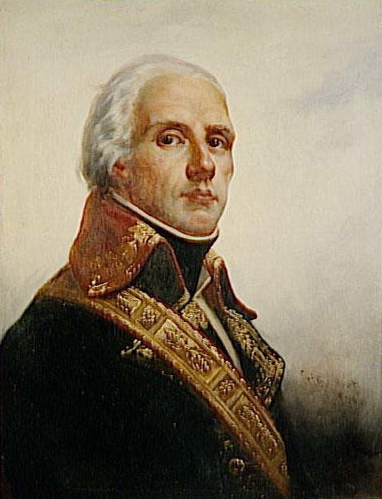
Portrait of Jacques François Dugommier, 1836

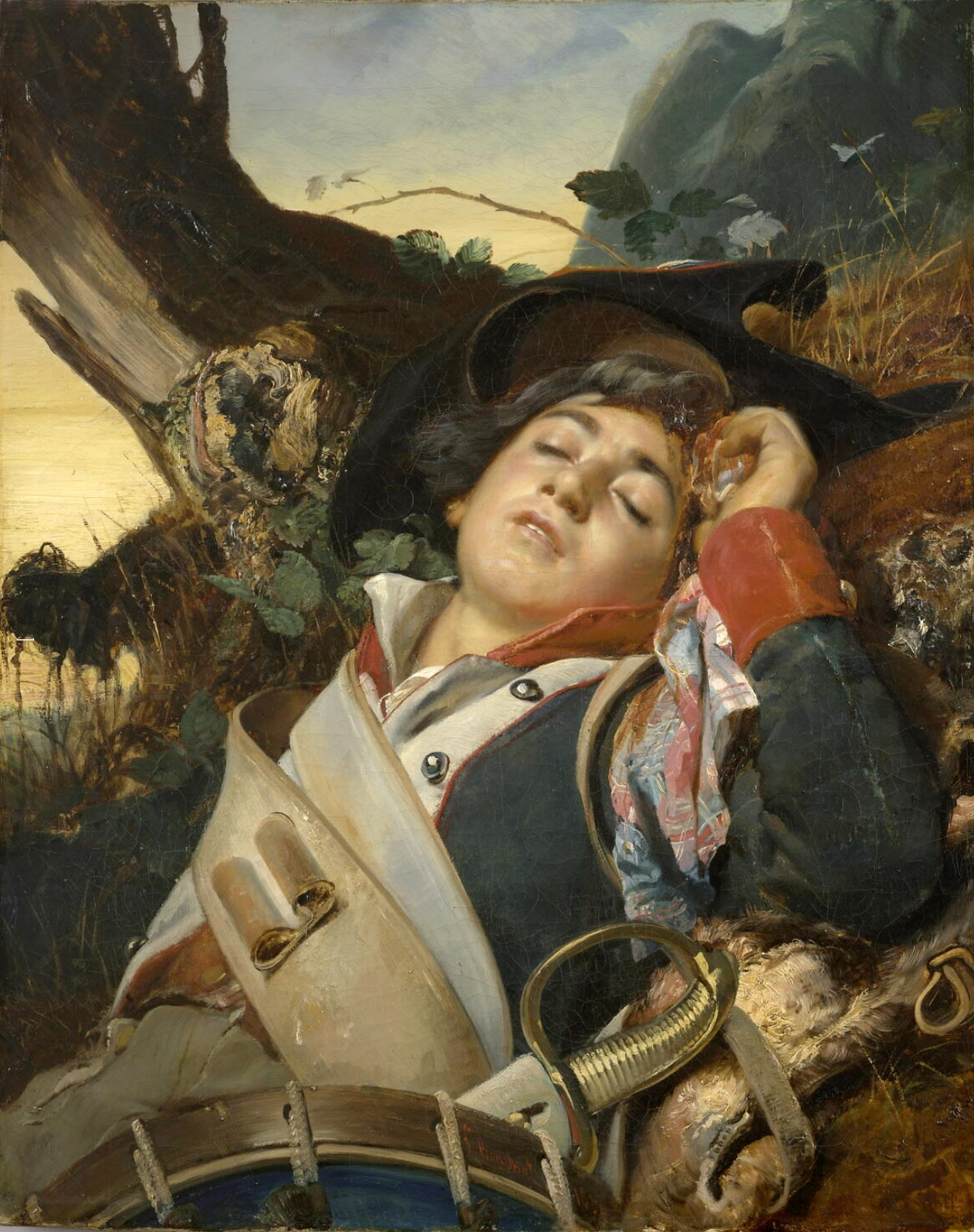
The Wounded Drummer, 1836

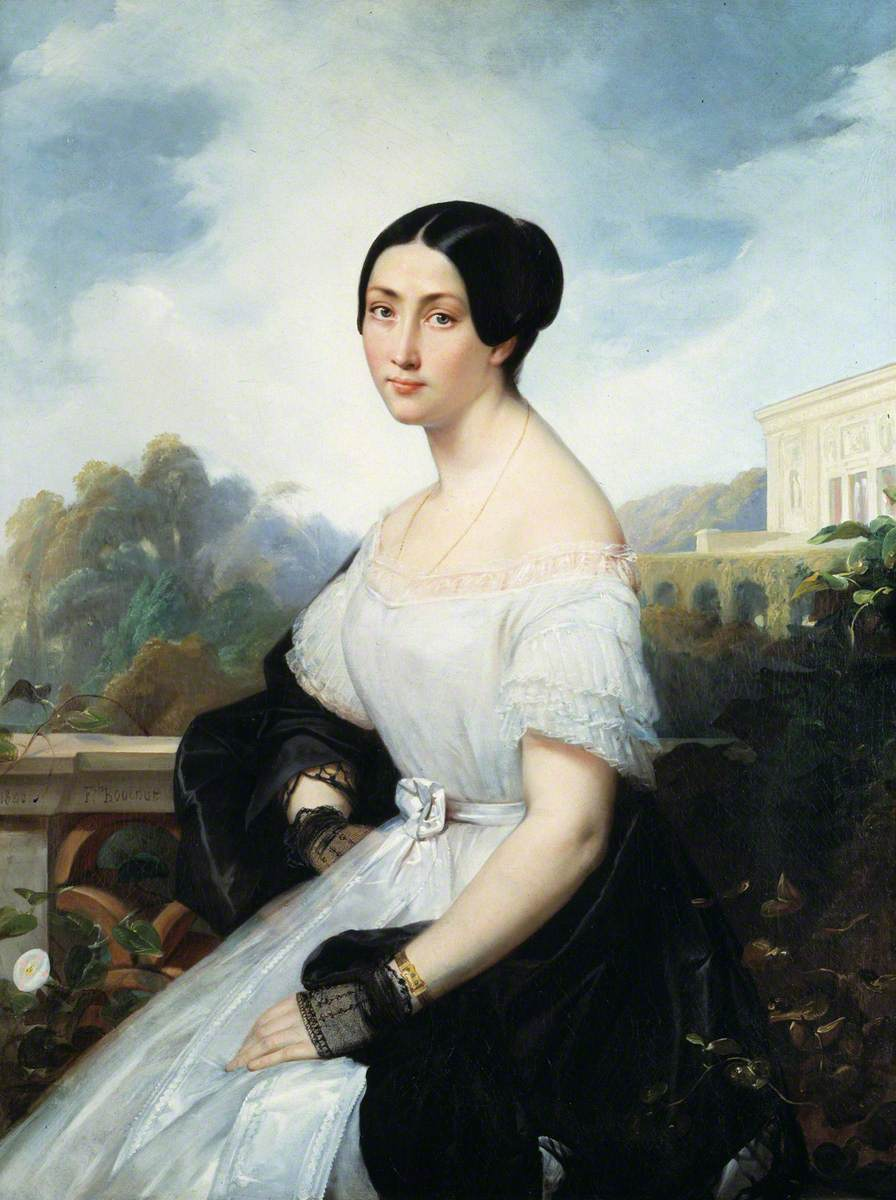
Portrait of Giulia Grisi, 1840

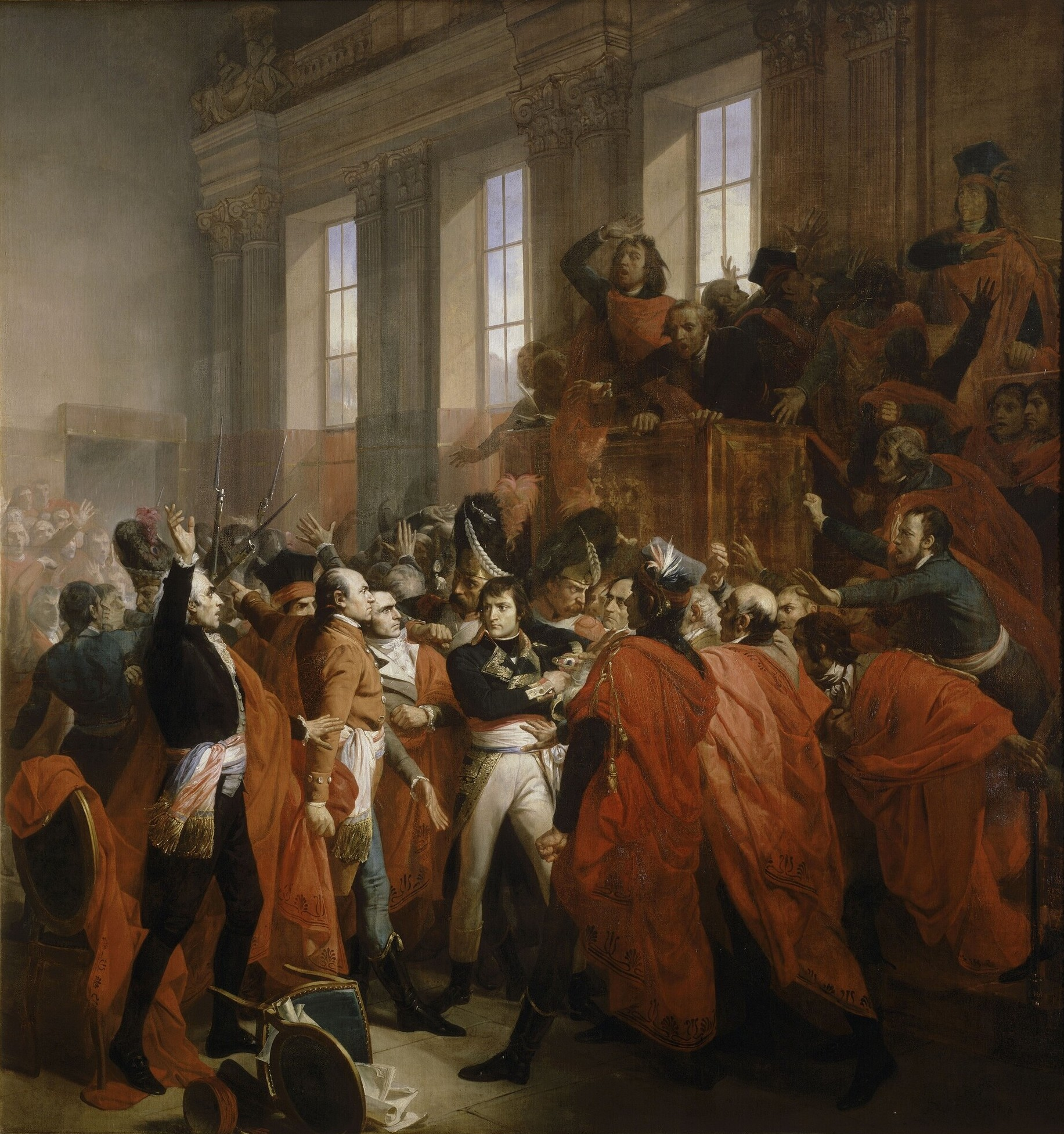
Bonaparte at the Council of Five Hundred at Saint-Cloud, 1840

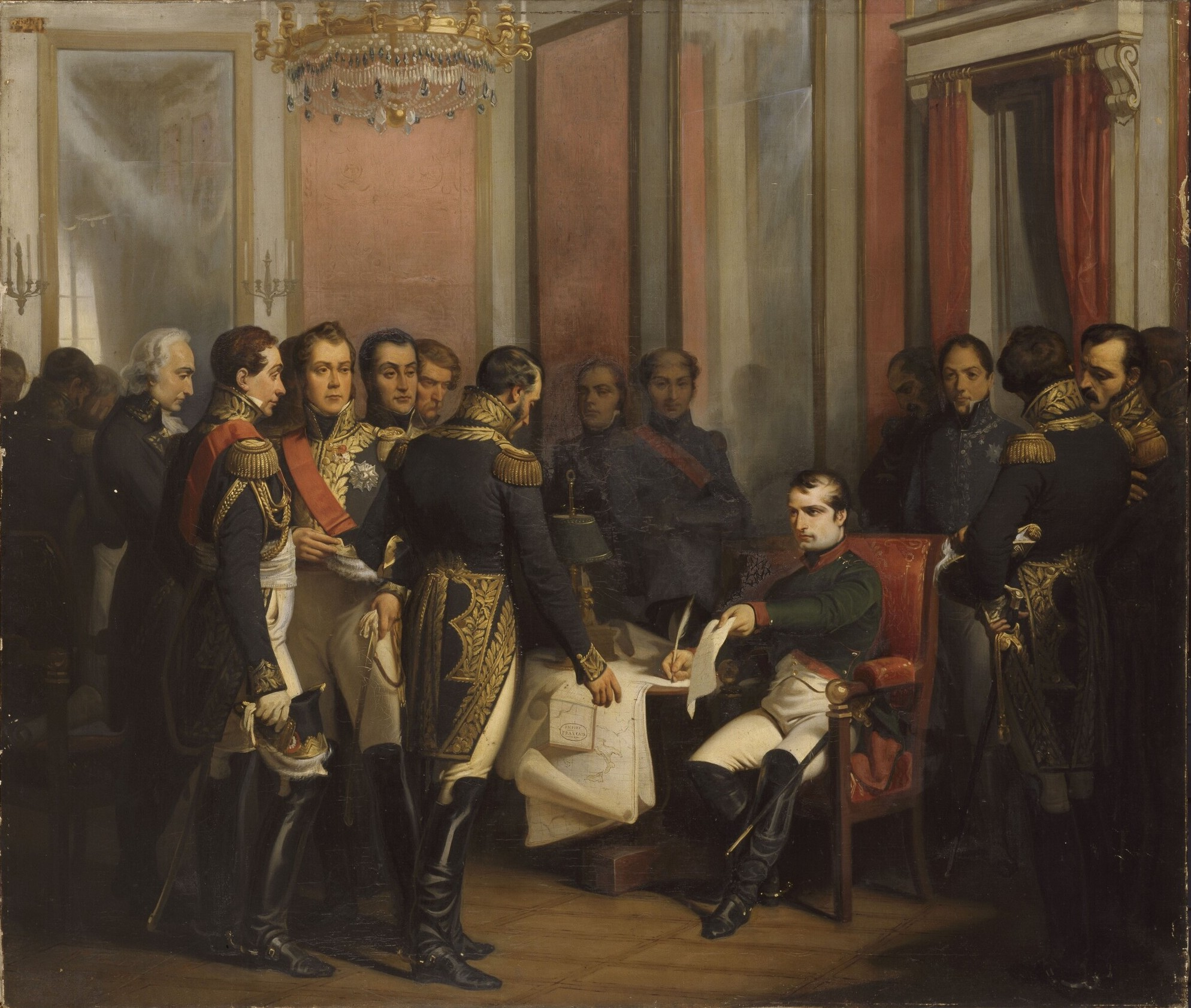
Napoleon Signing His Abdication at Fontainebleau, 1843
