= Napoleonic era =

1799–1815 historical period

- 1799–1815
| French Directory, French Revolution | Bourbon Restoration, Concert of Europe |
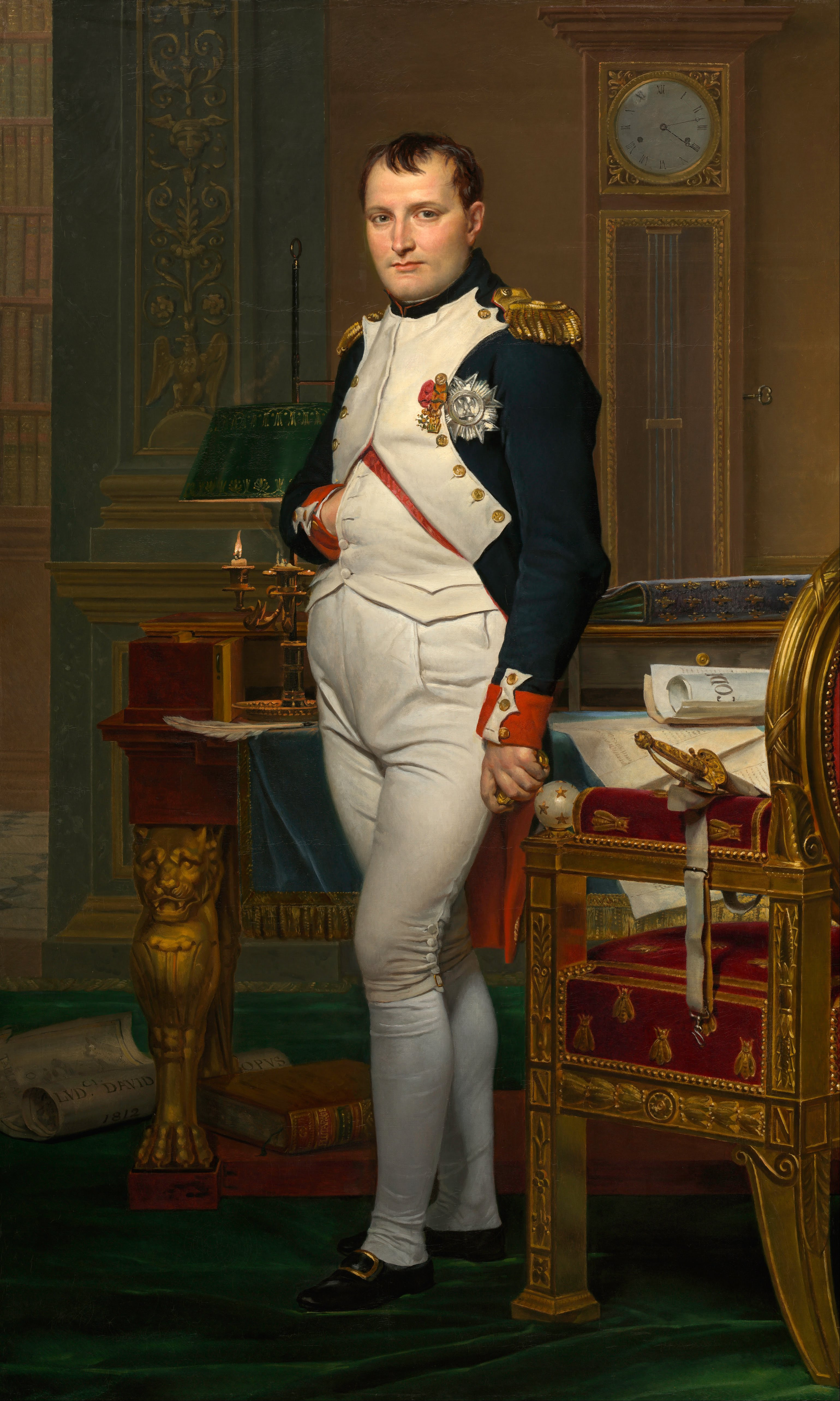
- The Emperor Napoleon in His Study at the Tuileries by Jacques-Louis David
- Monarch: Napoleon Bonaparte
- Leader: Napoleon Bonaparte: Charles Maurice de Talleyrand-Périgord

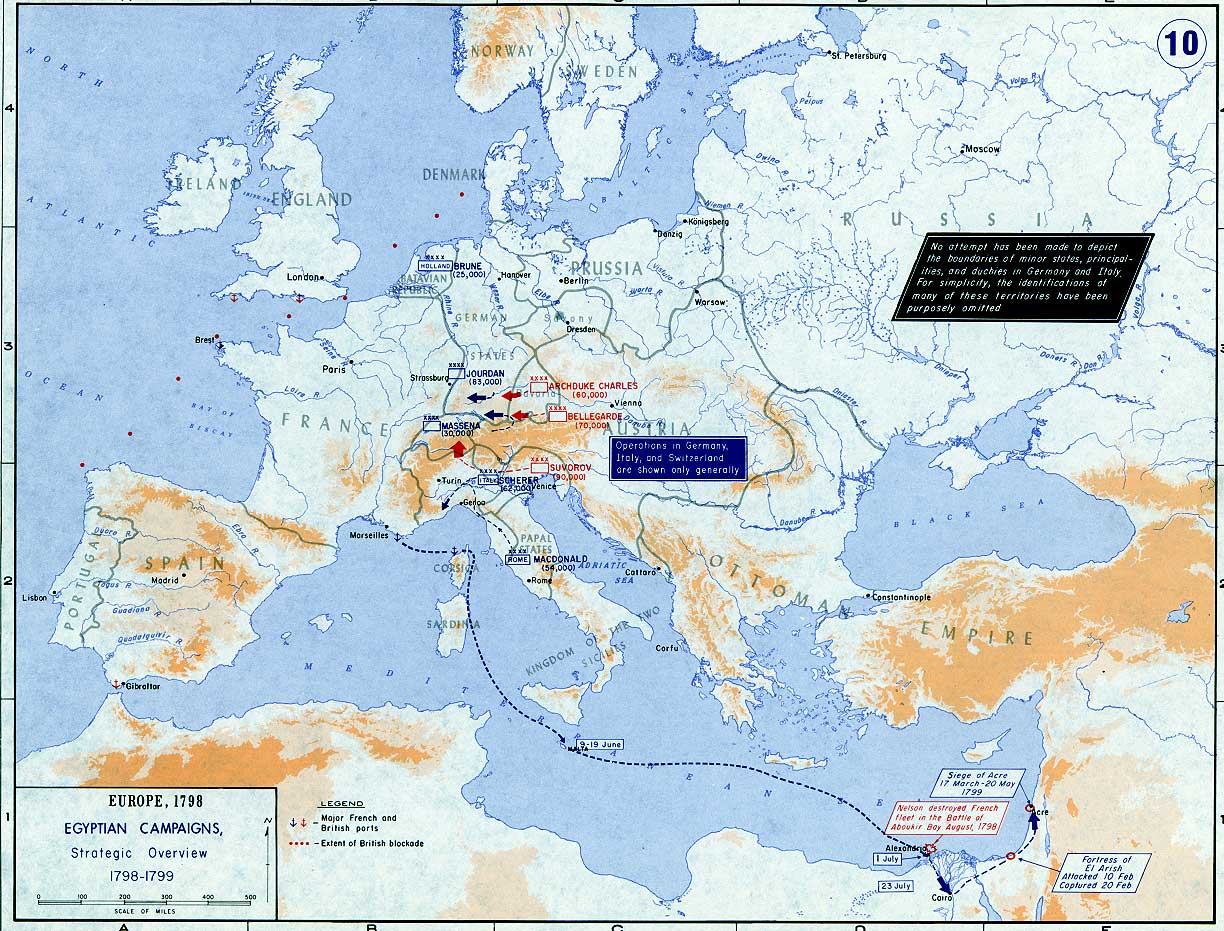
Strategic situation of Europe 1798

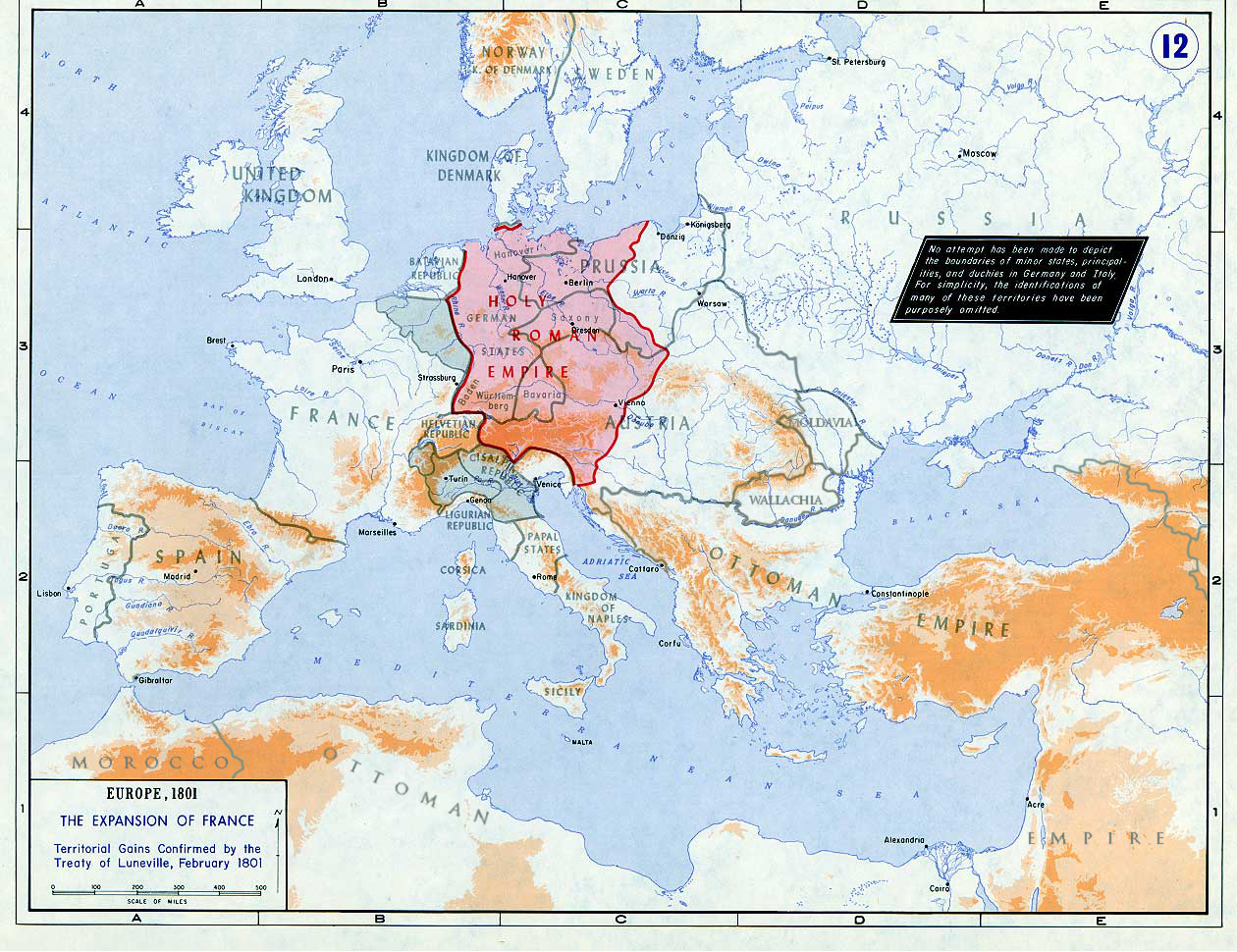
Strategic situation of Europe 1801

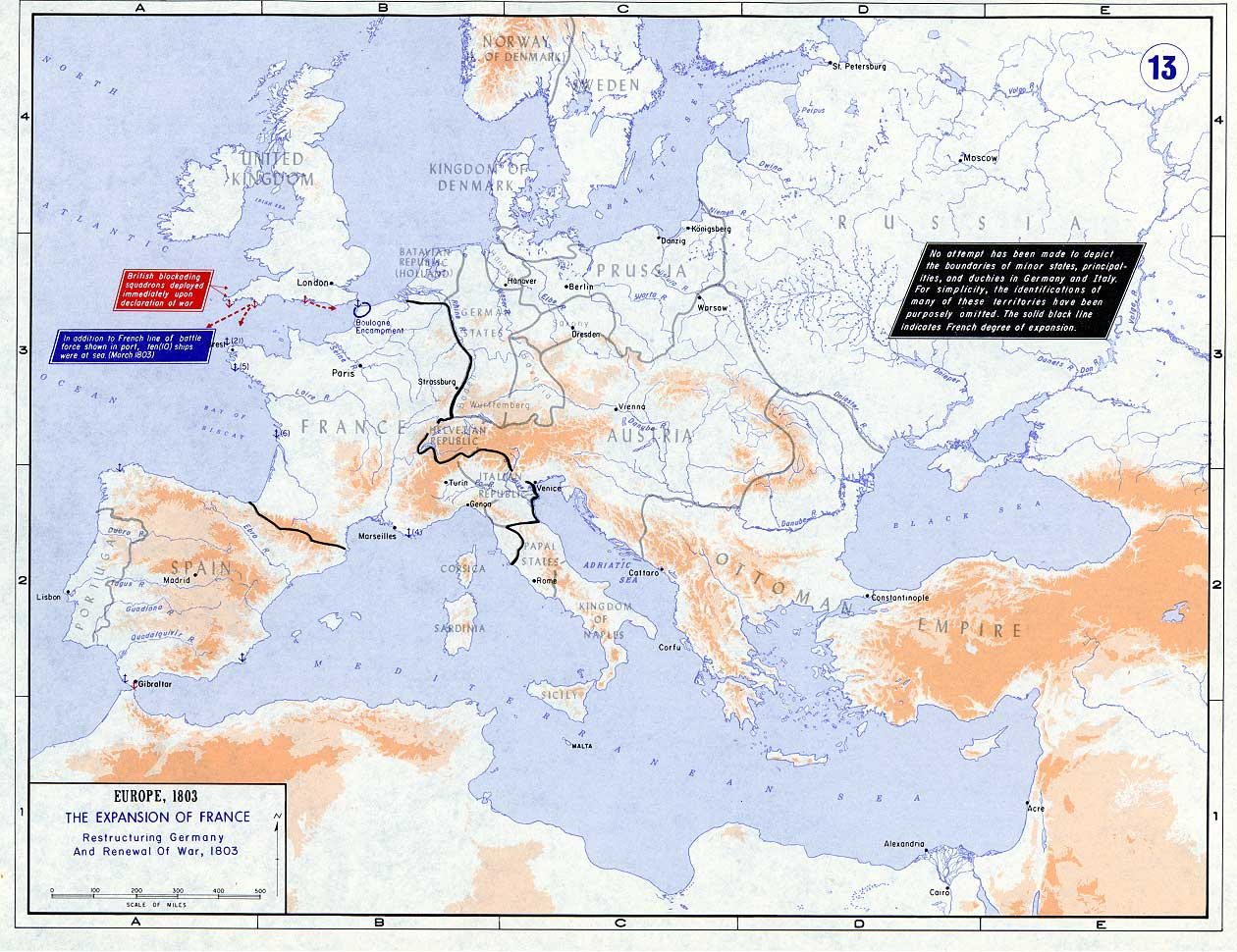
Strategic situation of Europe 1803

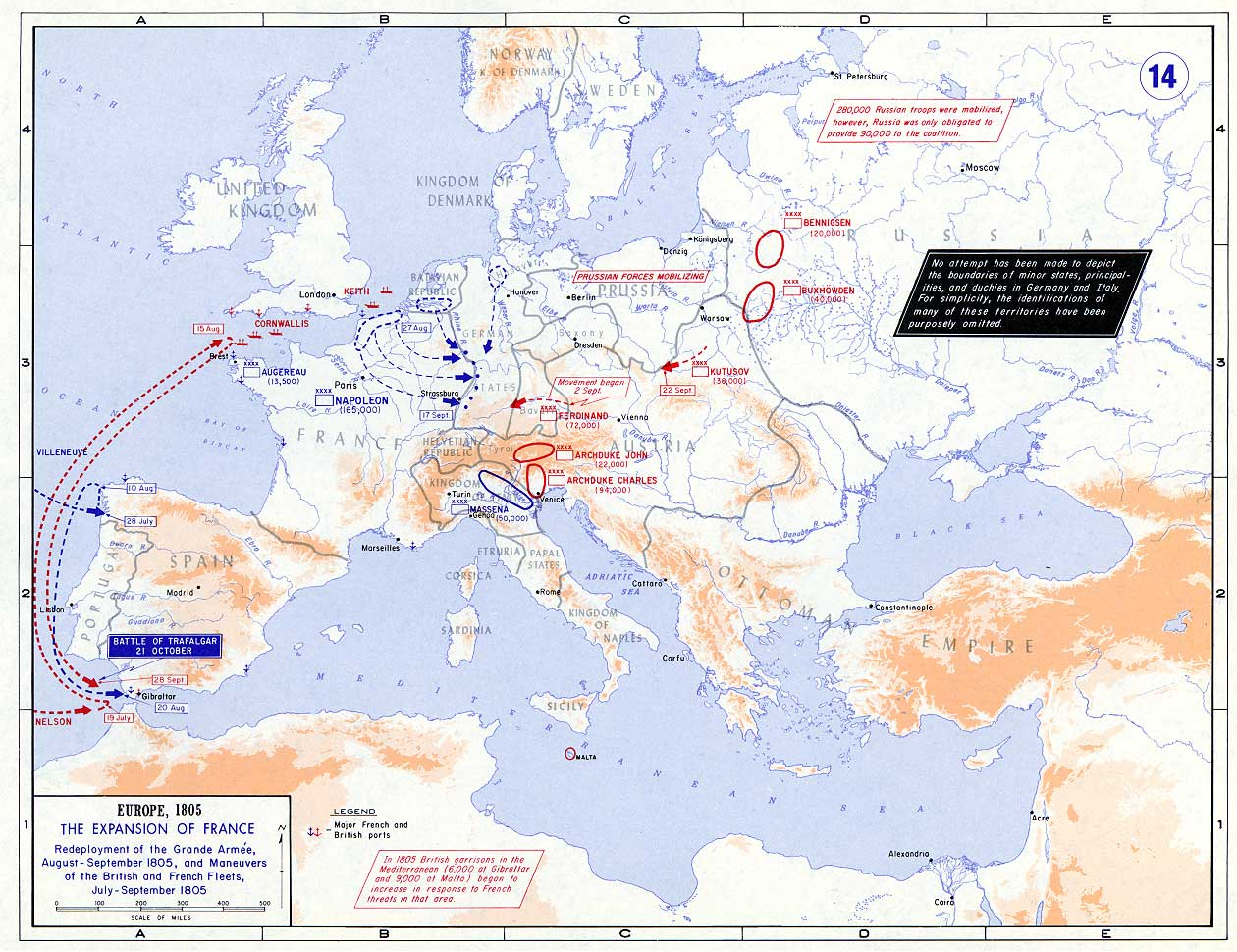
Strategic situation of Europe 1805

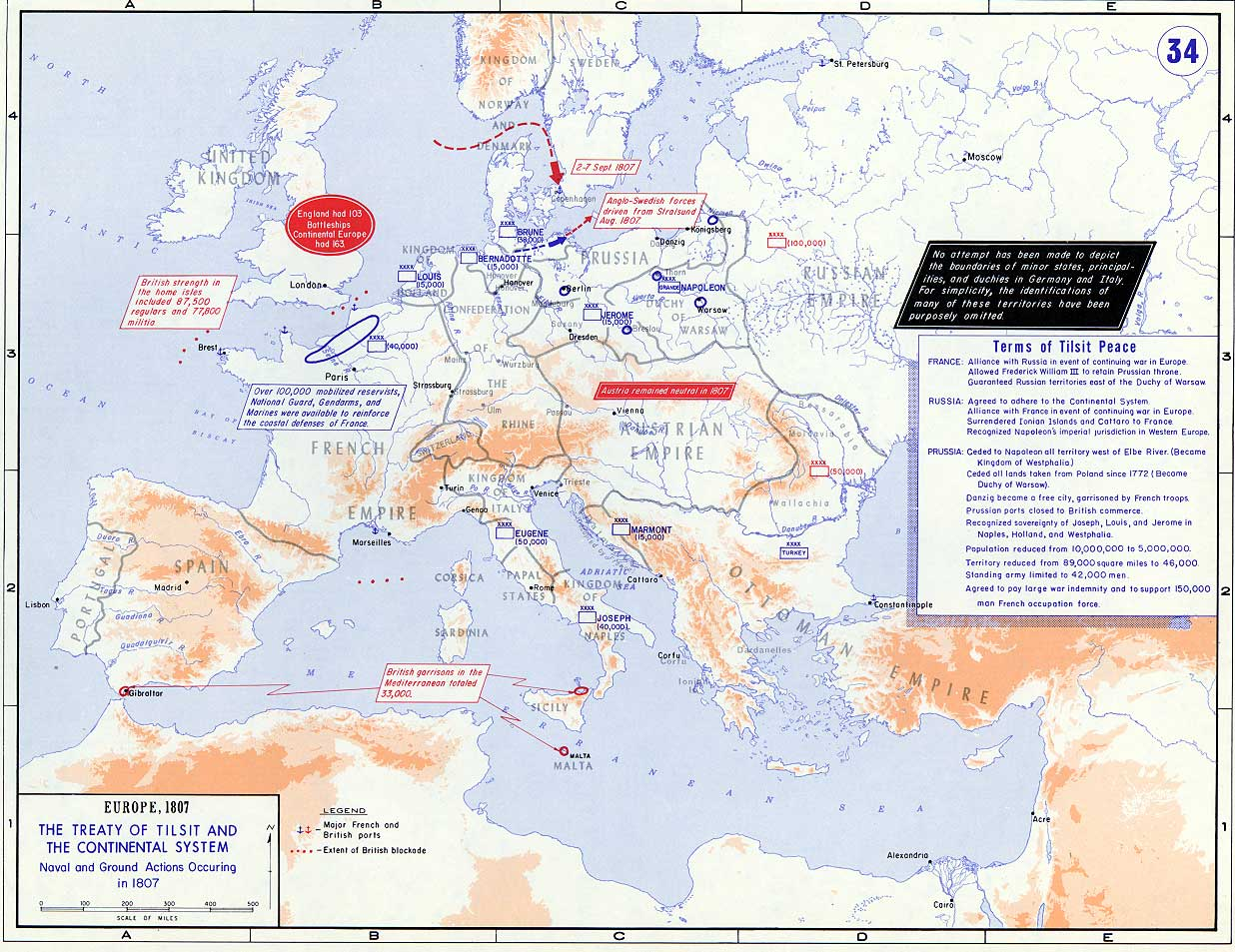
Strategic situation of Europe 1807

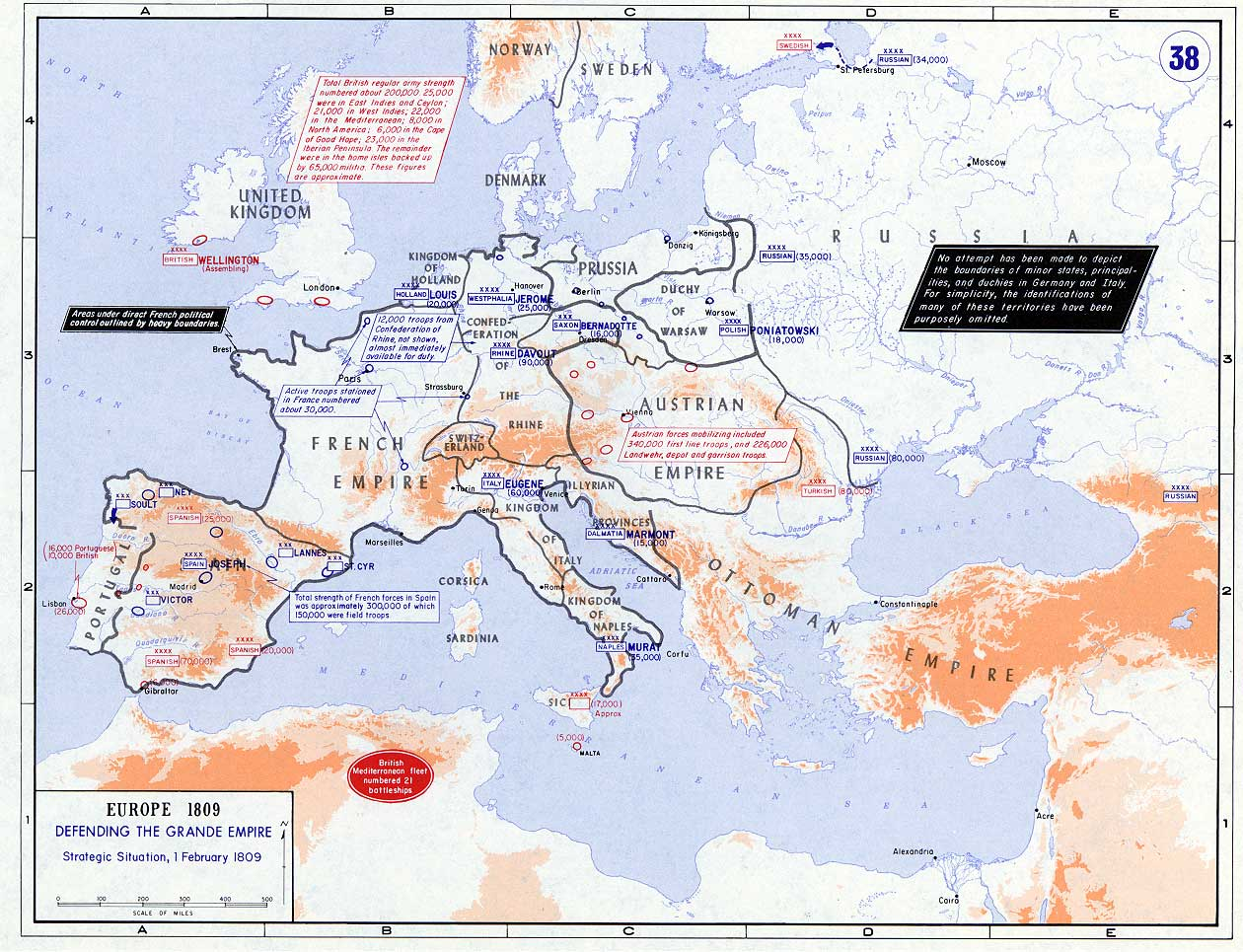
Strategic situation of Europe 1809

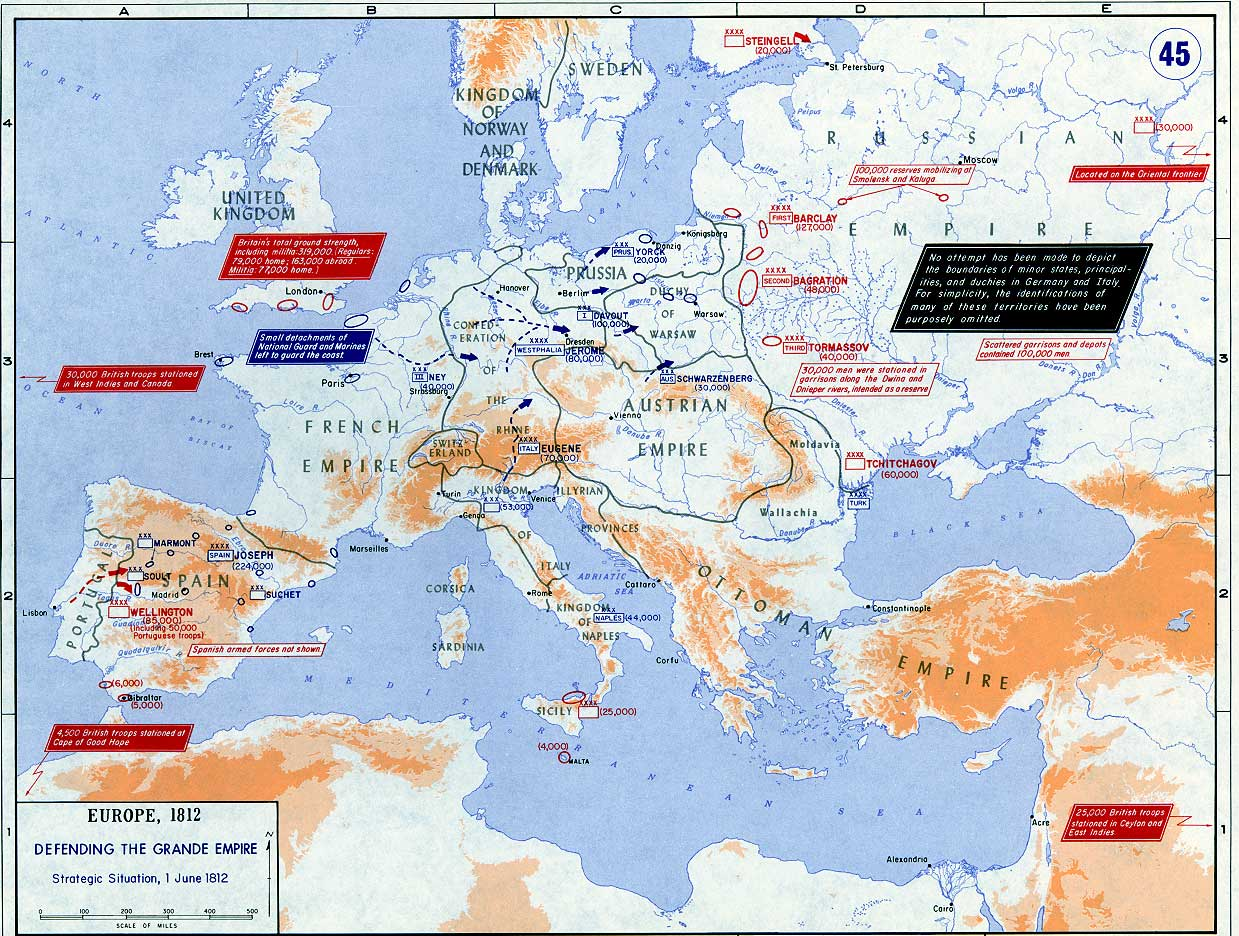
Strategic situation of Europe 1812

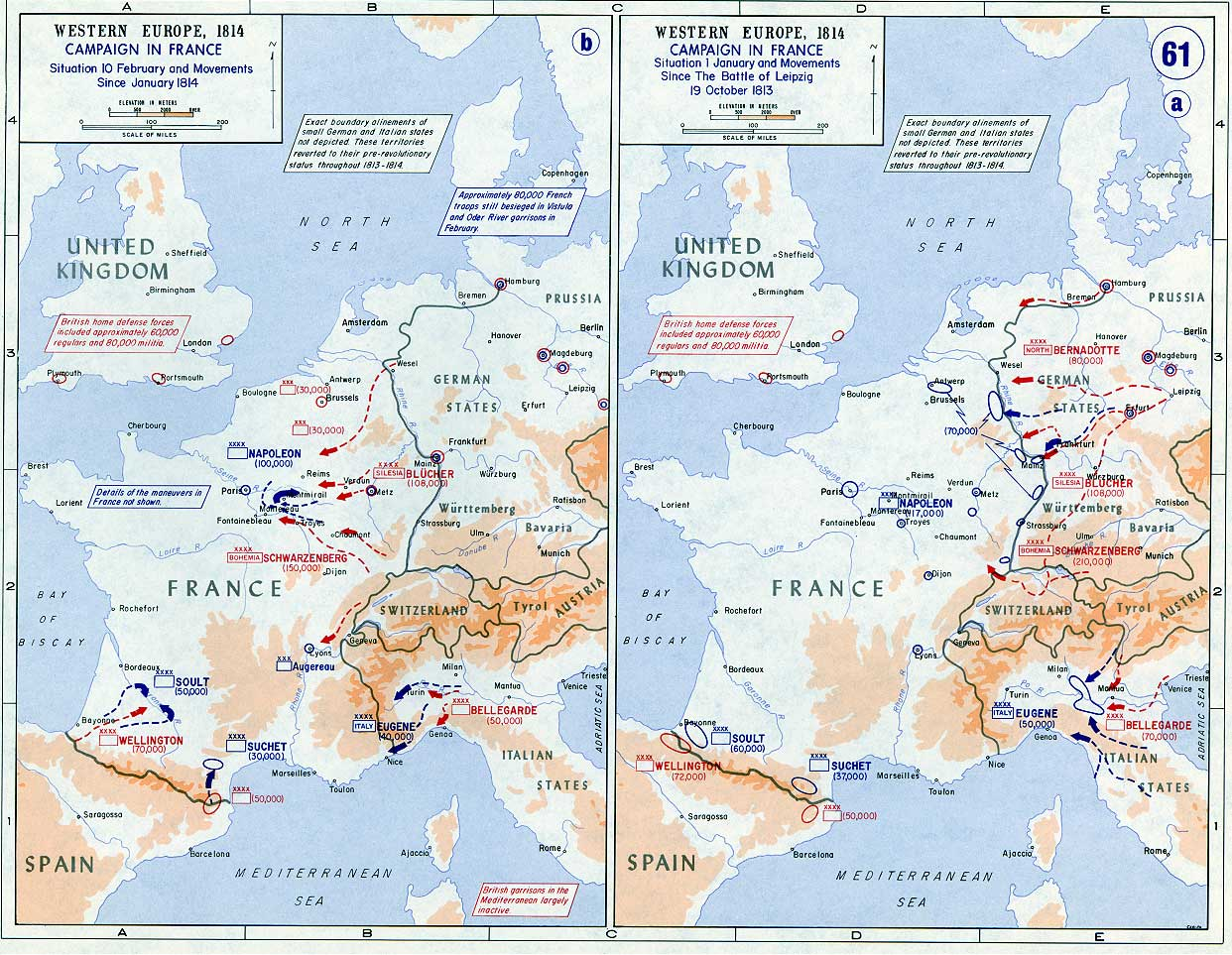
Strategic situation of Europe 1814

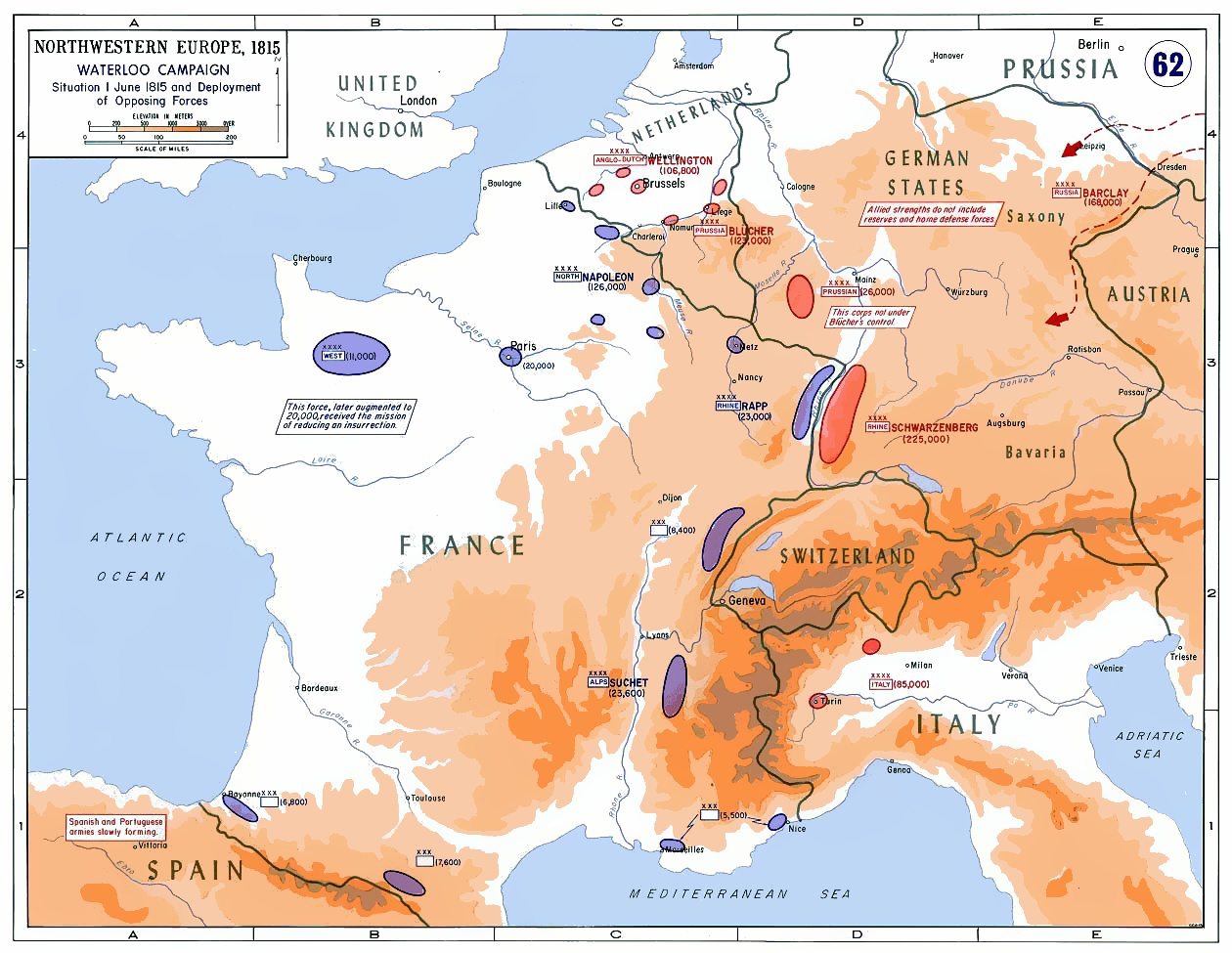
Strategic situation of Europe 1815

The Napoleonic era is a period in the history of France and Europe. It is generally classified as including the fourth and final stage of the French Revolution, the first being the National Assembly, the second being the Legislative Assembly, and the third being the French Directory. The Napoleonic era begins roughly with Napoleon Bonaparte's coup d'état on 18 Brumaire, overthrowing the Directory (9 November 1799), establishing the French Consulate, and ends during the Hundred Days and his defeat at the Battle of Waterloo (18 June 1815).

The Congress of Vienna soon set out to restore Europe to pre-French Revolution days. Napoleon brought political stability to a land torn by revolution and war. He made peace with the Catholic Church (Concordat of 1801) and reversed the most radical religious policies of the National Convention. In 1804, Napoleon promulgated the Civil Code, a revised body of civil law, which also helped stabilize French society. The Civil Code affirmed the political and legal equality of all adult men and established a merit-based society in which individuals advanced in education and employment because of talent rather than birth or social standing. The Civil Code confirmed many of the moderate revolutionary policies of the National Assembly but retracted measures passed by the more radical Convention. The Civil Code restored patriarchal authority in the family, for example by making women and children subservient to male heads of households.

Whilst working to stabilise France, Napoleon sought to extend his authority throughout Europe. Napoleon's armies conquered the Iberian peninsula and the Italian peninsula, occupied lands, and he forced Austria, Prussia, and Russia to ally with him and respect French hegemony in Europe. The United Kingdom (George III) refused to recognize French hegemony and continued the war throughout.

The First French Empire began to unravel in 1812, when he decided to invade Russia. Napoleon underestimated the difficulties his army would have to face whilst occupying Russia. Convinced that the Tsar was conspiring with his British enemies, Napoleon led an army of 600,000 soldiers to Moscow. He defeated the Russian army at Borodino before capturing Moscow, but the Tsar withdrew and Moscow was set ablaze, leaving Napoleon's vast army without adequate shelter or supplies. Napoleon ordered a retreat, but the bitter Russian winter and repeated Russian attacks whittled down his army, and only a battered remnant of 30,000 soldiers managed to limp back to French territory. The allies then continued a united effort against Napoleon (Battle of Leipzig) until they had seized Paris forcing his abdication in 1814. His return to power the next year was resisted by all the allies and his army was defeated by a Prussian and Anglo-Allied force at Waterloo.

== Rulers ==
Heads and leaders of states affected by Napoleon's regime and the Napoleonic wars:

- Austria
  - Archduchy of Austria: Francis II (1792–1835)
  - Austrian Empire: Francis I (1804–1835)
- Confederation of the Rhine: Protector Napoleon I (1806–1813)
- Denmark–Norway: Christian VII (1766–1808), Frederick VI (Regent 1784–1808, King of Denmark 1808–1839, King of Norway 1808–1814)
- Duchy of Warsaw: Frederick Augustus I of Saxony, by personal arrangement with Napoleon, partial liberation (1806–1815) of the former Commonwealth of Poland–Lithuania
- Egypt: Muhammad Ali (1805–1848)
- Etruria: Louis (1801–03), Charles Louis (1803–1807)
- France
  - French Republic: First Consul Napoleon Bonaparte (1799–1804)
  - French Empire: Napoleon I (1804–1814, 1815)
  - Kingdom of France: Louis XVIII (1814–15, 1815–1824)
- Great Britain
  - Kingdom of Great Britain: King George III (1760–1801), Prime Minister William Pitt the Younger (1793–1801)
  - United Kingdom of Great Britain and Ireland: King George III (1801–1820); Prince Regent George (1811–1820); Prime Ministers William Pitt the Younger (1801, 1804–06), Henry Addington (1801–04), The Lord Grenville (1806–07), The Duke of Portland (1807–09), Spencer Perceval (1809–1812), The Earl of Liverpool (1812–1827)
- Haiti: Jean-Jacques Dessalines (as Governor-General 1804, as Emperor Jacques I 1804–06), Henri Christophe (as President 1806–1811, as King Henri I 1811–1820)
- Holland: Louis I (1806–10), Louis II (1810)
- Holy Roman Empire: Francis II (1792–1806)
- Italy: Napoleon I (1805–1814)
- Montenegro: Petar I Petrović-Njegoš (1782–1830)
- Naples: Ferdinand IV (1799–1806, 1815–16), Joseph Bonaparte (1806–08), Joachim Murat (1808–1815)
- Netherlands: William I (1815–1840)
- Ottoman Empire: Selim III (1789–1807), Mustafa IV (1807–08), Mahmud II (1808–1839)
- Papal States: Pius VII (1800–1823)
- Portugal: Mary I (1777–1816), John VI (Regent 1799–1816, King 1816–1826)
- Prussia: Frederick William III (1797–1840)
- Qing Dynasty: Jiaqing Emperor (1796–1820)
- Russian Empire: Paul I (1796–1801), Alexander I (1801–1825)
- Sardinia: Charles Emmanuel IV (1796–1802), Victor Emmanuel I (1802–1821)
- Saxony: Frederick Augustus I (1763–1827)
- Serbia
  - Revolutionary Serbia was in a state of rebellion against the Ottoman rule, de facto independent, led initially Karađorđe 1804–1813 who was succeeded by Miloš Obrenović from 1815 onwards.
- Sicily: Ferdinand III (1759–1816)
- Spain: Charles IV (1788–1808), Ferdinand VII (1808, 1813–1833), Joseph I (1808–1813)
- Sweden: Gustav IV Adolf (1792–1809), Charles XIII (1809–1818)
- United States: Presidents John Adams (1797–1801), Thomas Jefferson (1801–1809), James Madison (1809–1817)
- Württemberg: Frederick I (1797–1816)

== Wars ==
- French Revolutionary Wars (1792–1802)
  - Egyptian Campaign (1798–1801)
  - War of the Second Coalition (1799–1802)
- White Lotus Rebellion (1796–1804)
- Napoleonic Wars (1803–1815)
  - War of the Third Coalition (1805)
  - War of the Fourth Coalition (1806–1807)
  - Gunboat War (1807–1814)
  - Peninsular War (1808–1814)
  - War of the Fifth Coalition (1809)
  - French invasion of Russia (1812)
  - War of the Sixth Coalition (1812–1814)
  - Hundred Days (1815)
- Russo-Turkish War (1806–1812)
- Anglo-Turkish War (1807–1809)
- Anglo-Russian War (1807–1812)
- Finnish War (1808–1809)
- War of 1812 (1812–1815)
- Swedish-Norwegian War (1814)

== Major battles ==
- Battle of Marengo – 14 June 1800
- Battle of Abukir – 8 March 1801
- Battle of Alexandria -21 March 1801
- Battle of Copenhagen – 2 April 1801
- Battle of Trafalgar – 21 October 1805
- Battle of Austerlitz – 2 December 1805
- Battle of Jena-Auerstedt – 14 October 1806
- Battle of Eylau – 7–8 February 1807
- Battle of Friedland – 14 June 1807
- Battle of Vimeiro – 21 August 1808
- Battle of Somosierra – 30 November 1808
- Battle of Eckmühl – 21–22 April 1809
- Battle of Aspern-Essling – 21–22 May 1809
- Battle of Wagram – 5–6 July 1809
- Battle of Talavera – 27–28 July 1809
- Battle of Salamanca – 22 July 1812
- Battle of Borodino – 7 September 1812
- Battle of Lützen – 2 May 1813
- Battle of Bautzen – 20–21 May 1813
- Battle of Vitoria – 21 June 1813
- Battle of Dresden – 26–27 August 1813
- Battle of Leipzig – 16–19 October 1813
- Battle of Paris – 30–31 March 1814
- Battle of Waterloo – 18 June 1815

== See also ==
- First Empire: The International Magazine for the Napoleonic Enthusiast, Historian, and Gamer (magazine)
