= Hand-in-waistcoat =

Human position

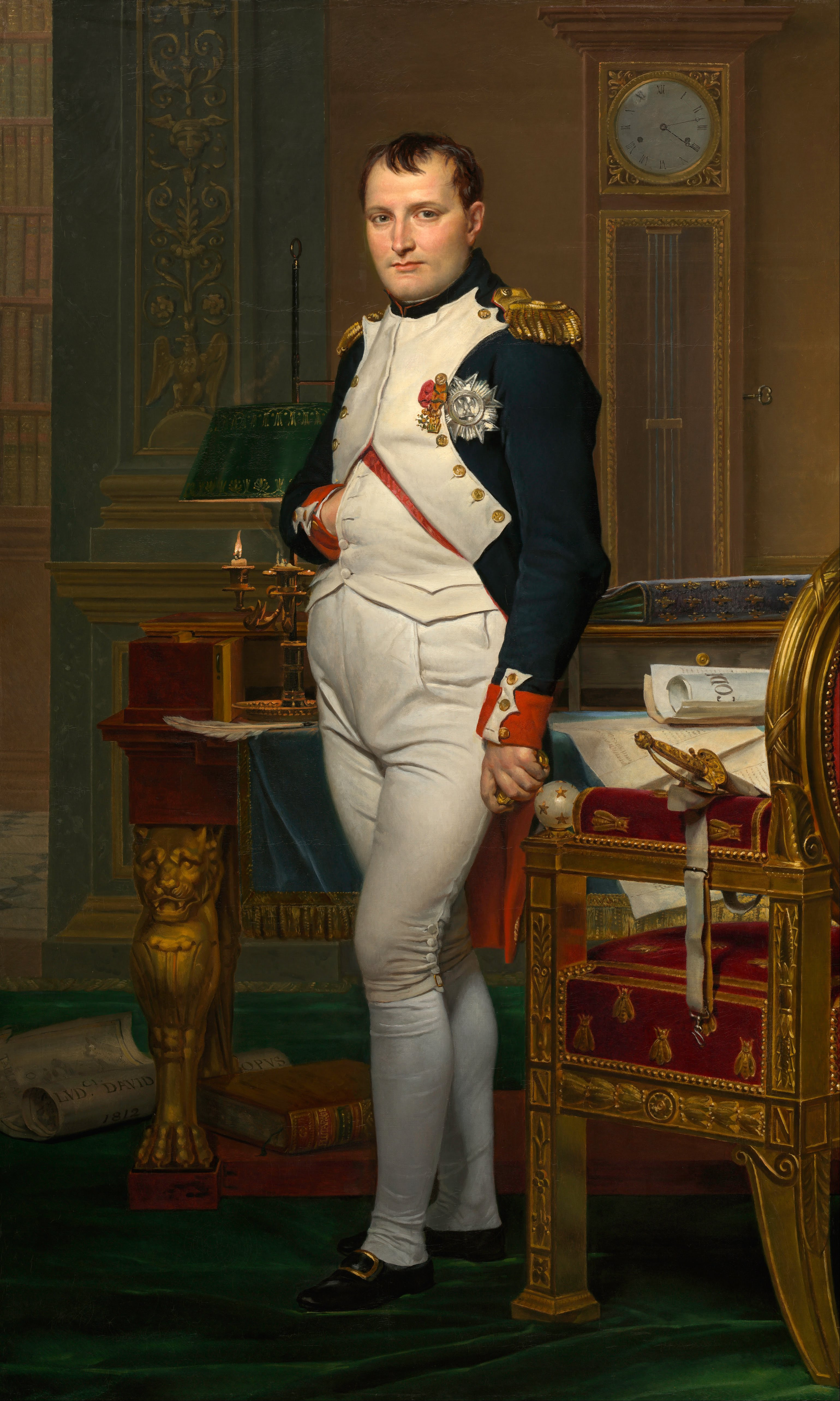
The Emperor Napoleon in His Study at the Tuileries (1812), exhibiting the hand-in-waistcoat gesture

The hand-in-waistcoat (also referred to as hand-inside-vest, hand-in-jacket, hand-held-in, or hidden hand) is a gesture commonly found in portraiture during the 18th and 19th centuries, as well as mid-19th century photography. The pose appeared by the 1750s to indicate leadership in a calm and firm manner. It is most often associated with Napoleon Bonaparte because it was used in several portraits made by his artist, Jacques-Louis David, amongst them the 1812 painting Napoleon in His Study. The pose, thought of as being stately, was copied by other portrait painters across Europe and America. Most paintings and photographs show the right hand inserted into the waistcoat/jacket, but some sitters appear with the left hand inserted. It is also a gesture known to Freemasons.

== Background ==
The hand-in-waistcoat gesture traces back to classical times – Aeschines, founder of a rhetoric school, suggested that speaking with an arm outside of the chiton was bad manners. The pose was used in 18th-century British portraiture as a sign that the sitter was from the upper class. An early 18th-century guide on "genteel behavior" indicates that it denotes "manly boldness tempered with modesty." Art historian Arline Meyer has argued that – in addition to mirroring actual social behaviour or borrowing from classical statuary – the pose became a visualization of English national character in the post-Restoration period; in the context of increasing Anglo-French rivalry, it promoted "a natural, modest, and reticent image that was sanctioned by classical precedent" in contrast to "the gestural exuberance of the French rhetorical style with its Catholic and absolutist associations".

== Appearance in photography ==
With the invention of photography, the pose continued but may have had an additional purpose in preventing blurring by maintaining the sitter's hand in a single place. It is commonly seen in photographs of members of the military, with several photographs of notable figures during the American Civil War showing the pose, or indicated by three open buttons on a tunic.

== Gallery ==
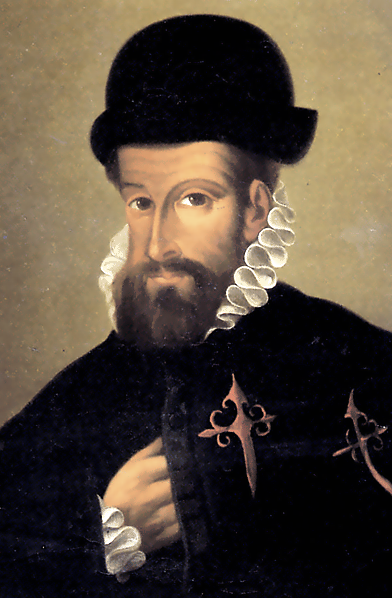
Francisco Pizarro González, Spanish conquistador

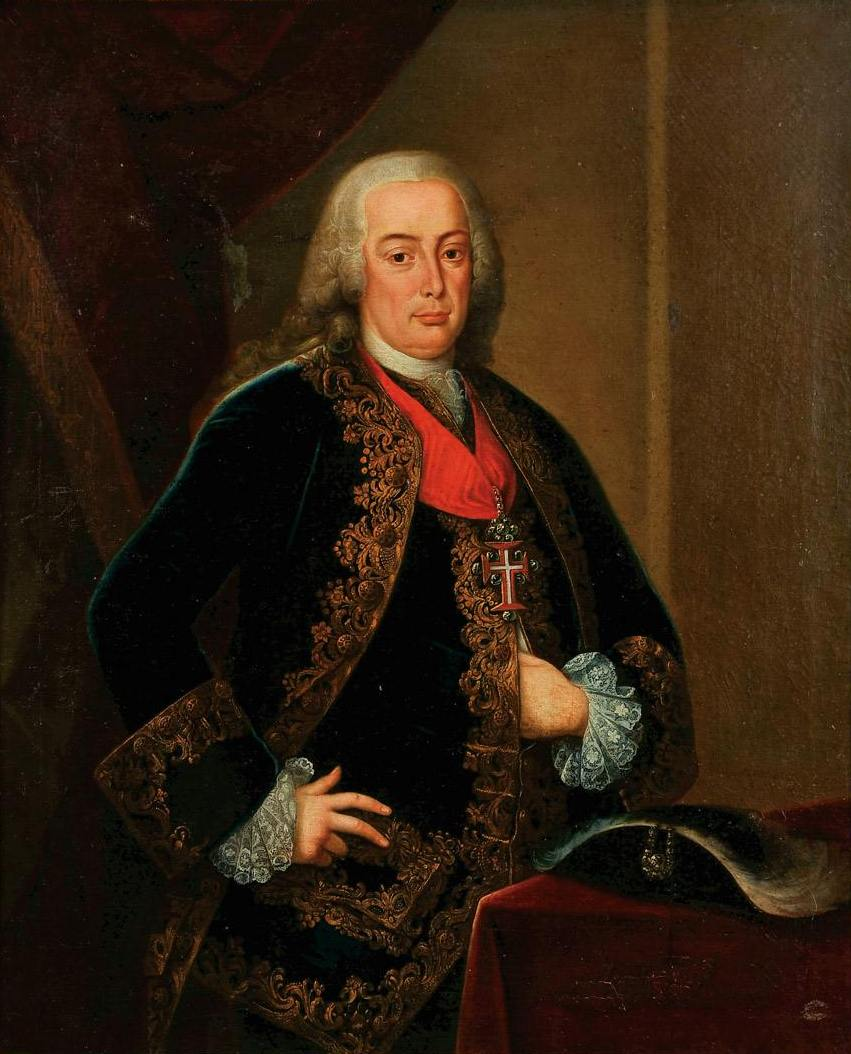
The Marquis de Pombal, Portuguese statesman

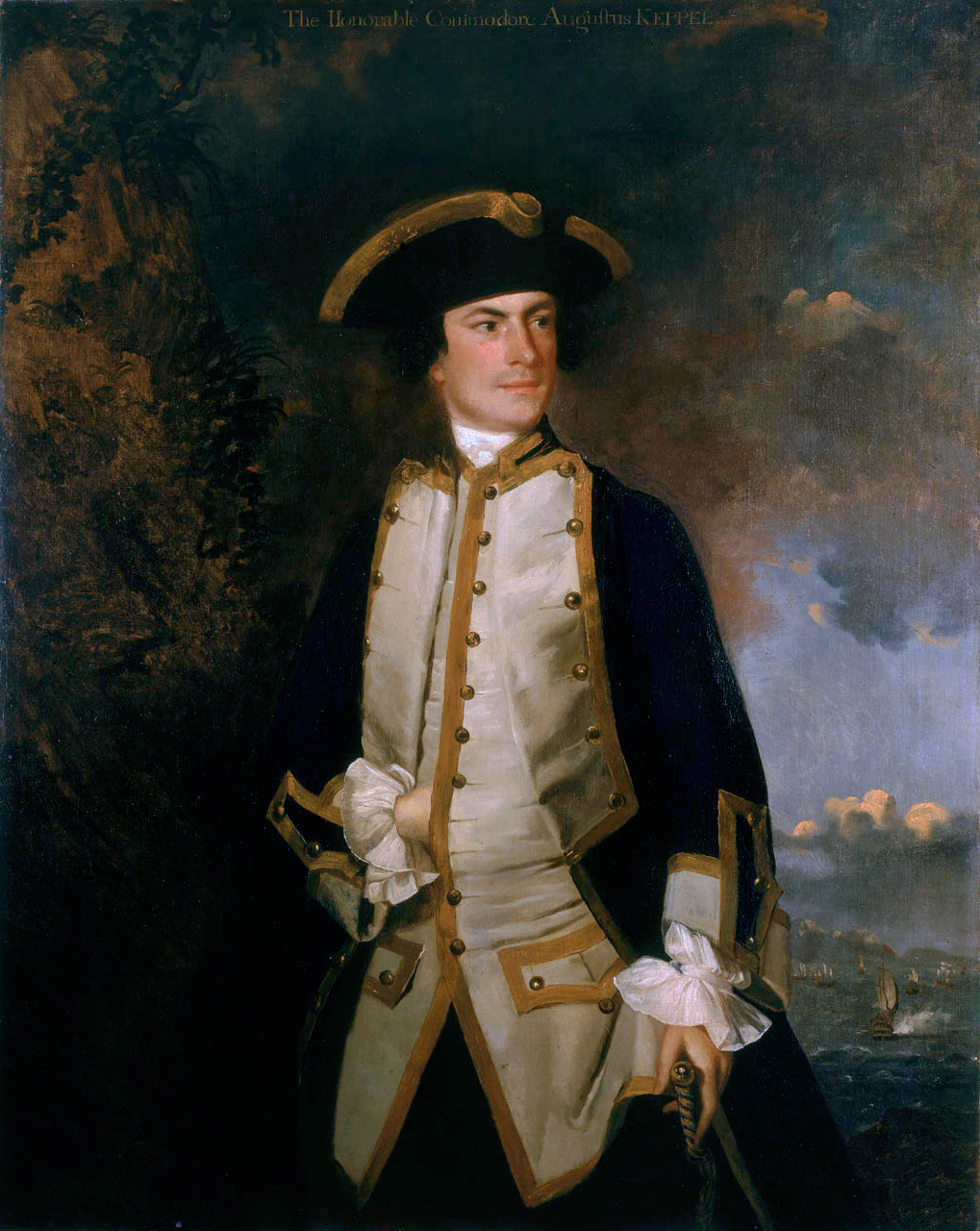
Augustus Keppel, 1st Viscount Keppel, British naval officer

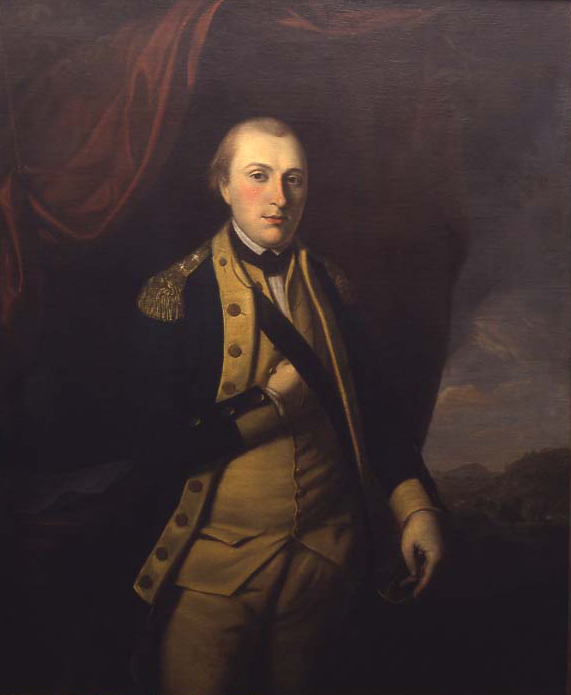
General Lafayette

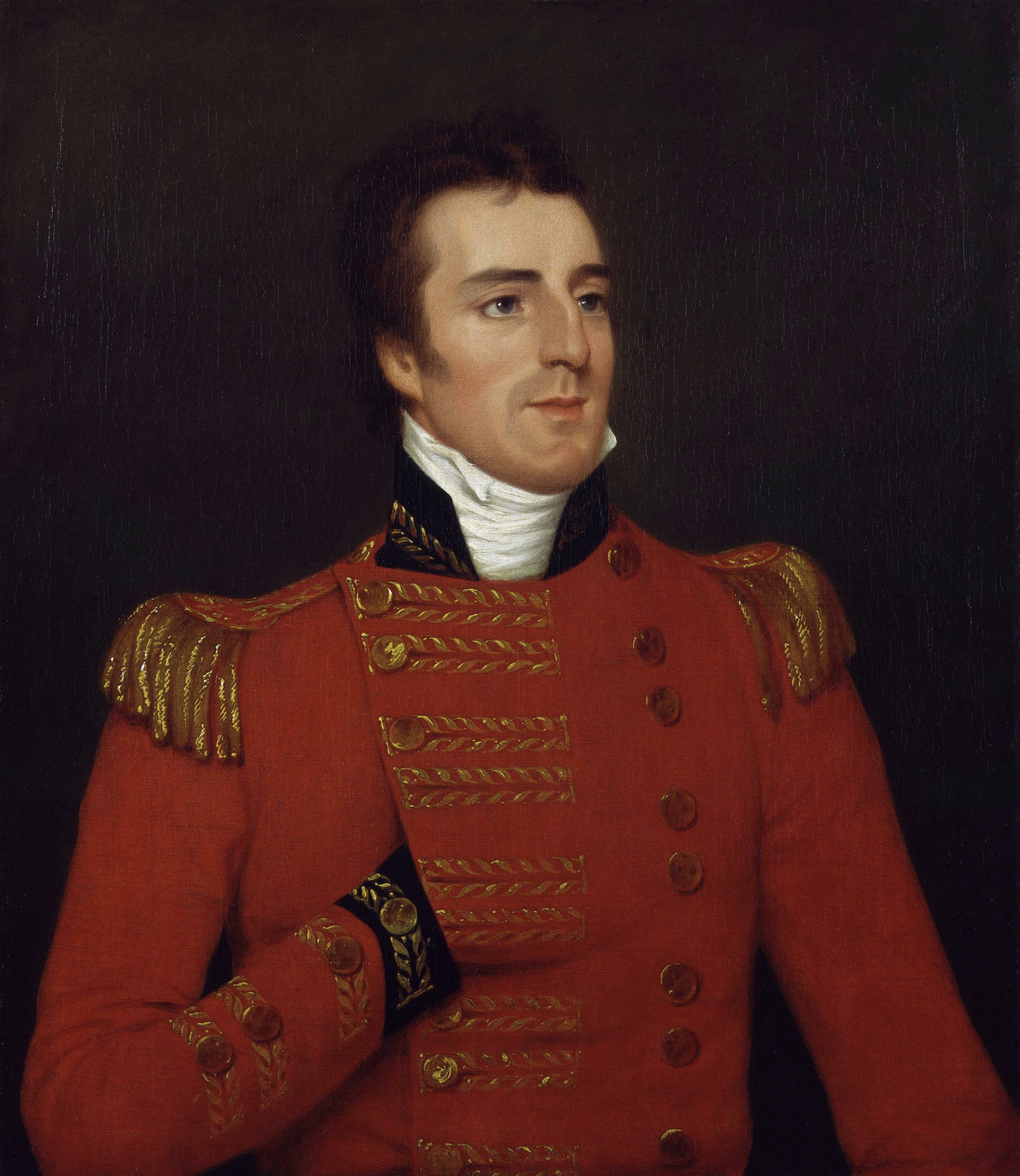
Arthur Wellesley, 1st Duke of Wellington

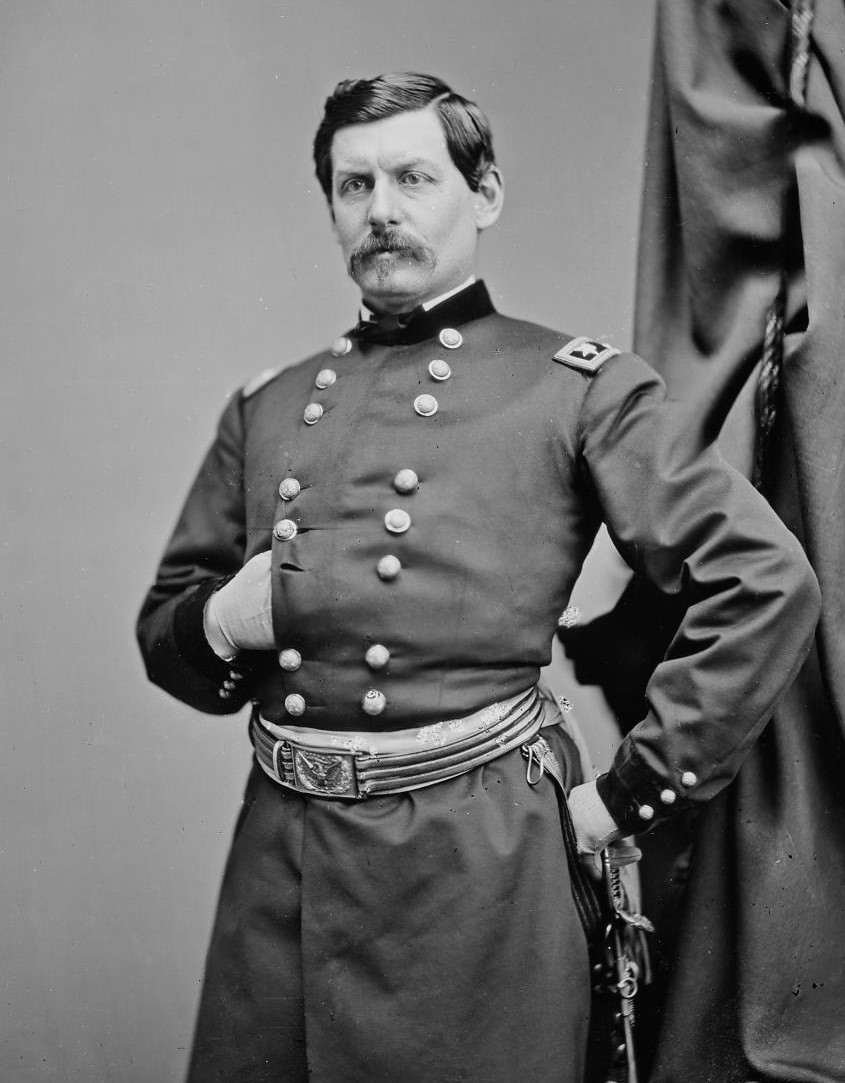
George McClellan

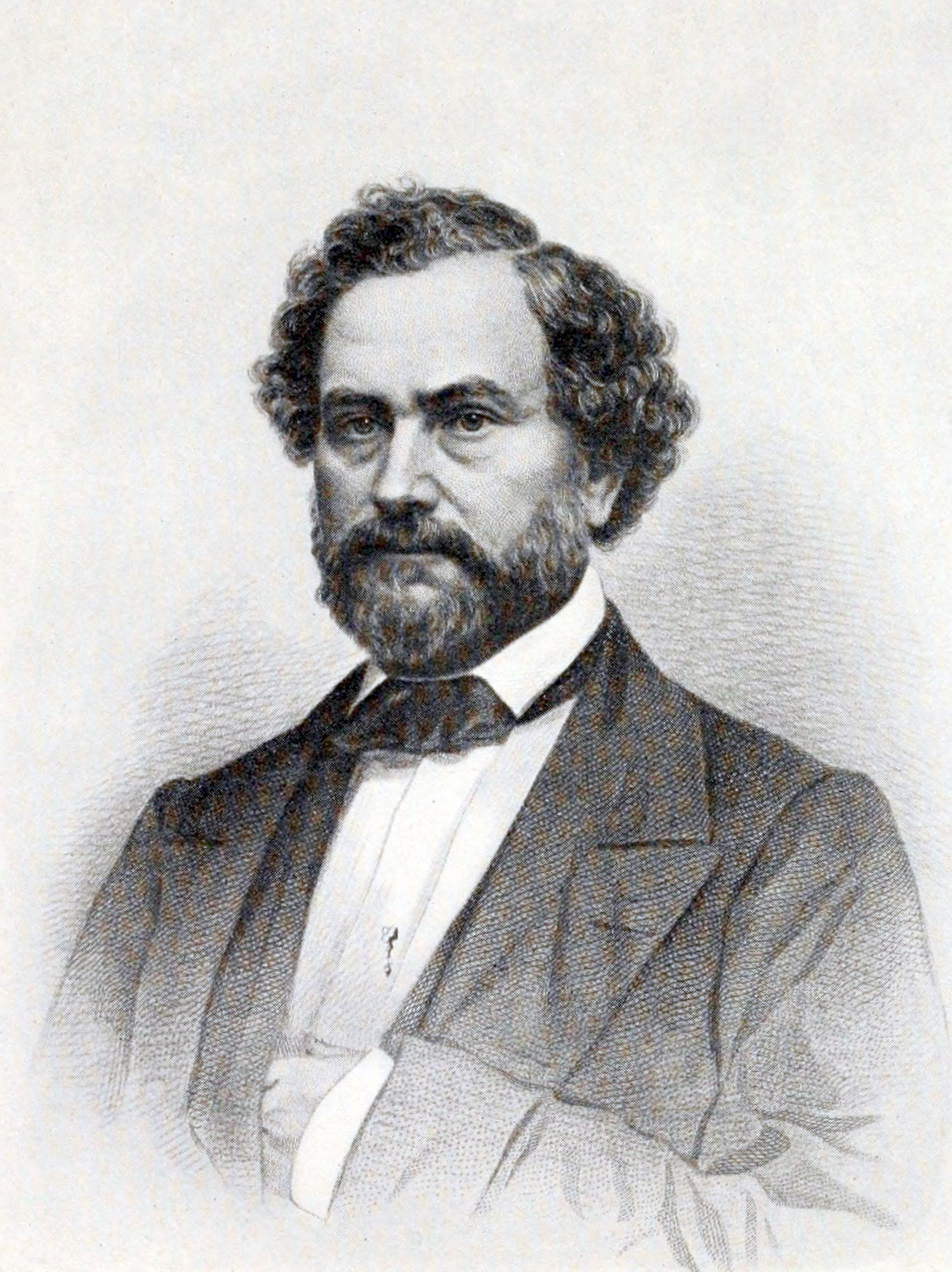
Samuel Colt, US industrialist

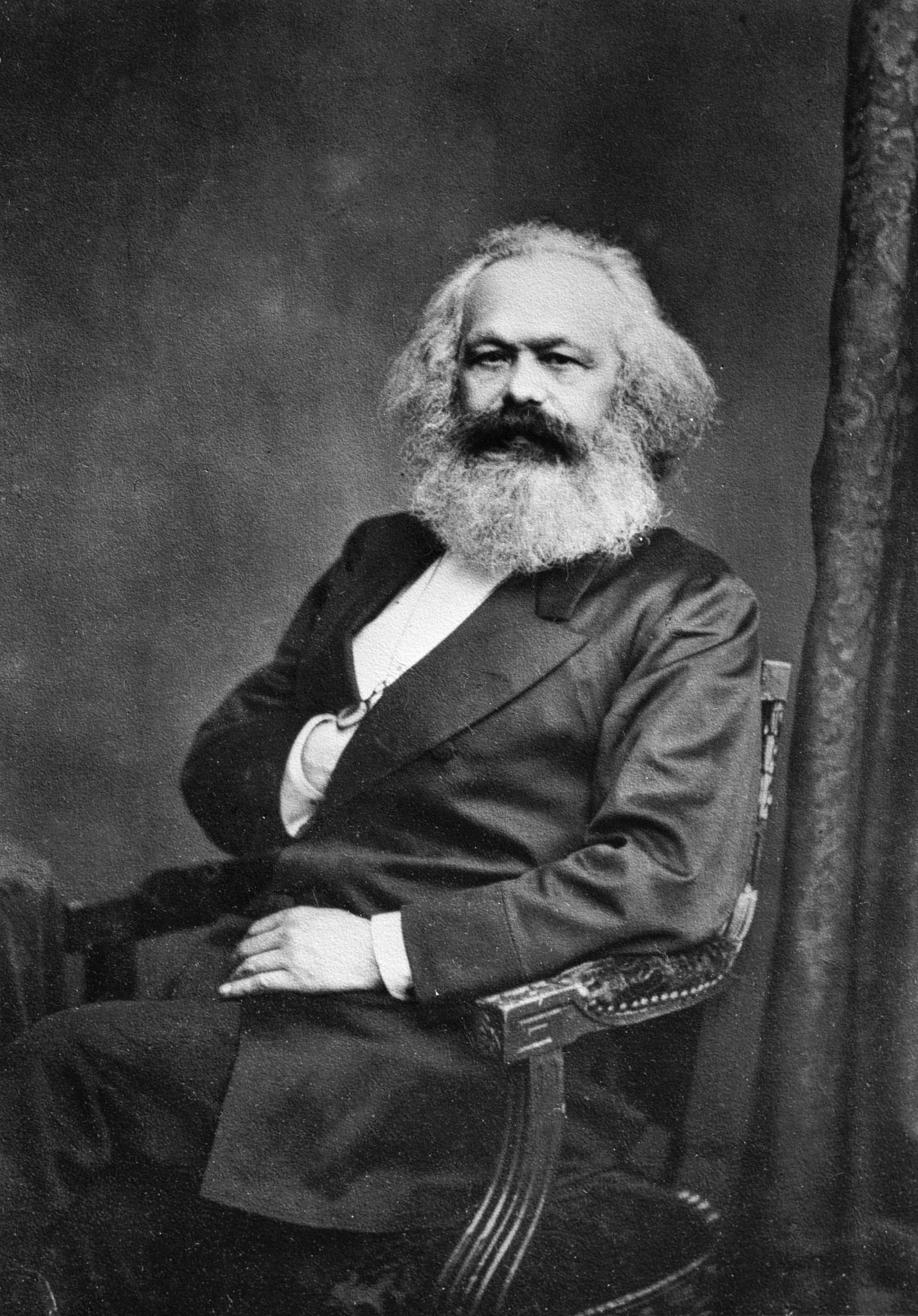
Karl Marx

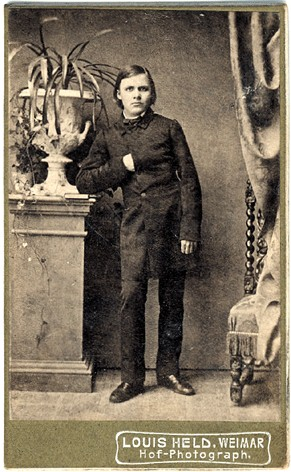
Friedrich Nietzsche at age 17

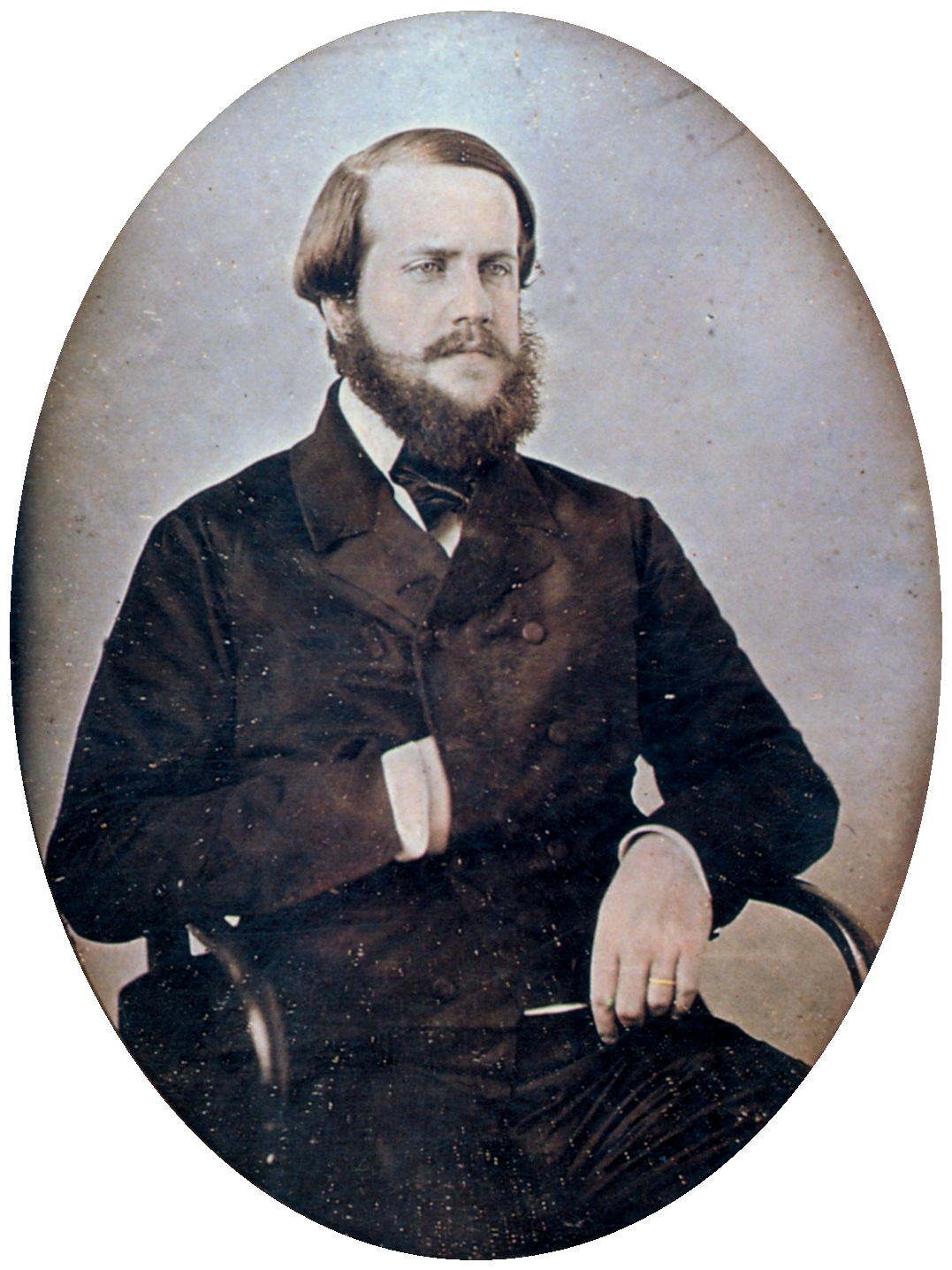
Emperor Pedro II of Brazil

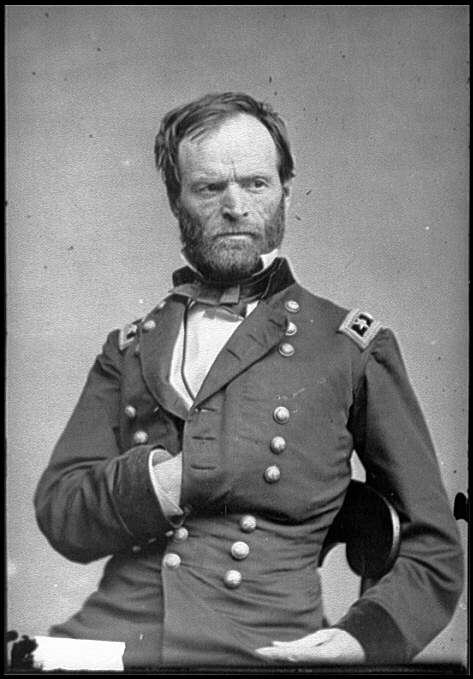
William Tecumseh Sherman

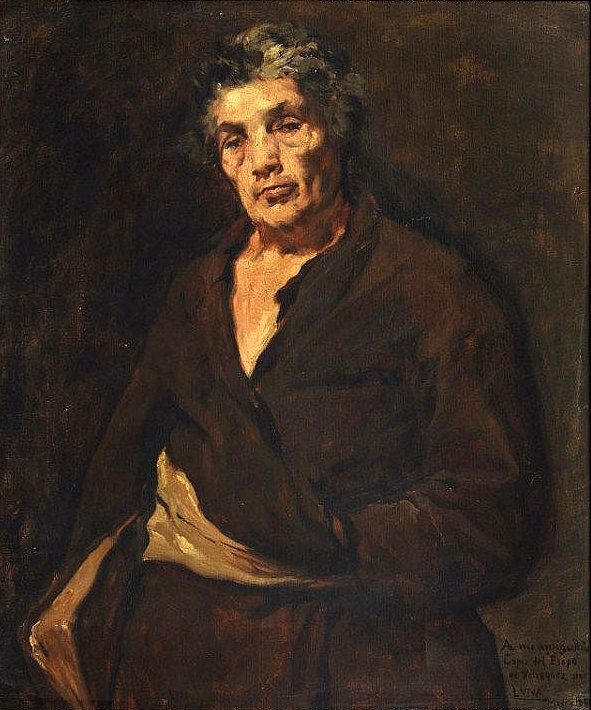
Artist’s impression of ancient Greek author Aesop (painting ca. 1638 by Diego Velázquez).

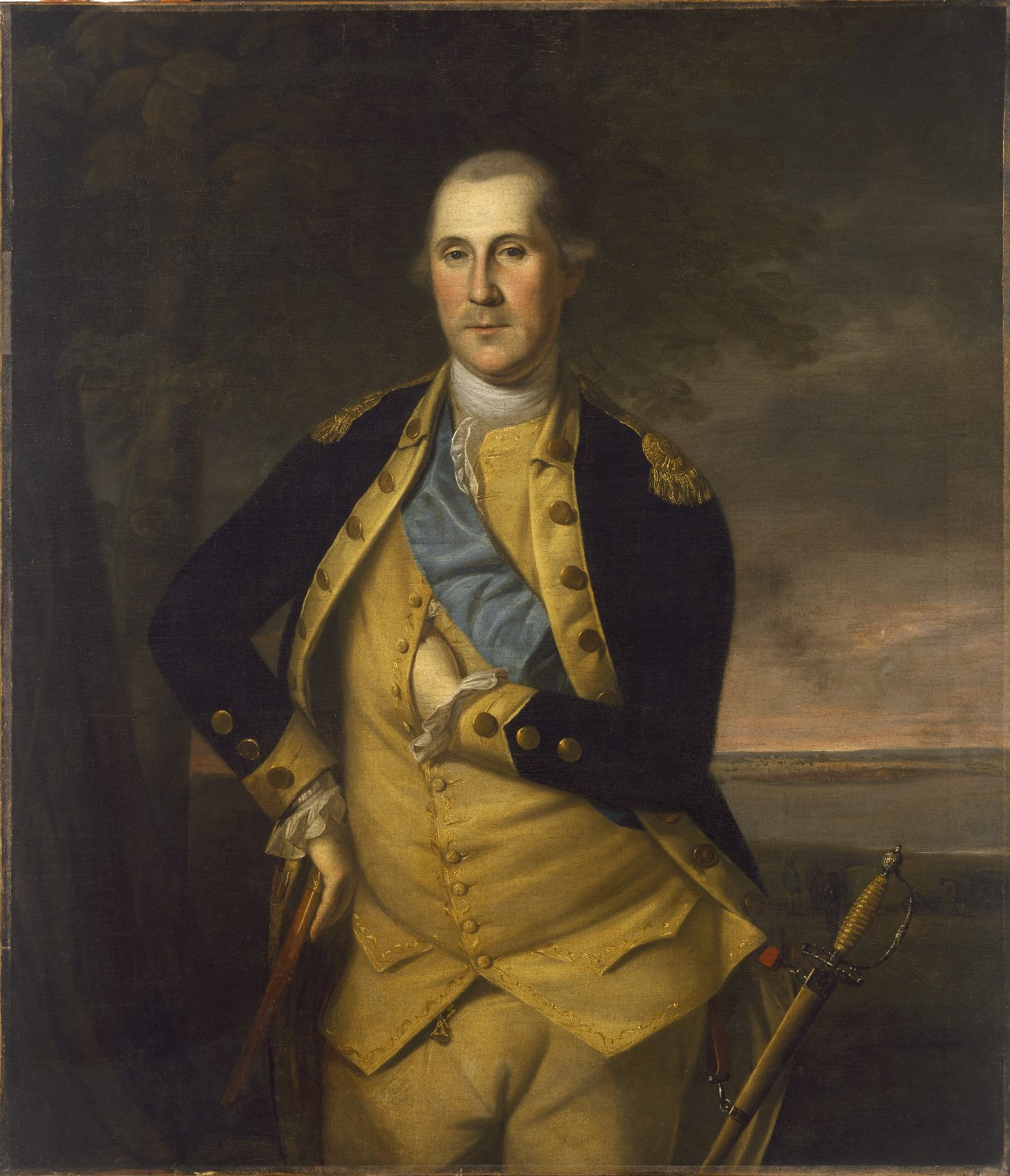
George Washington

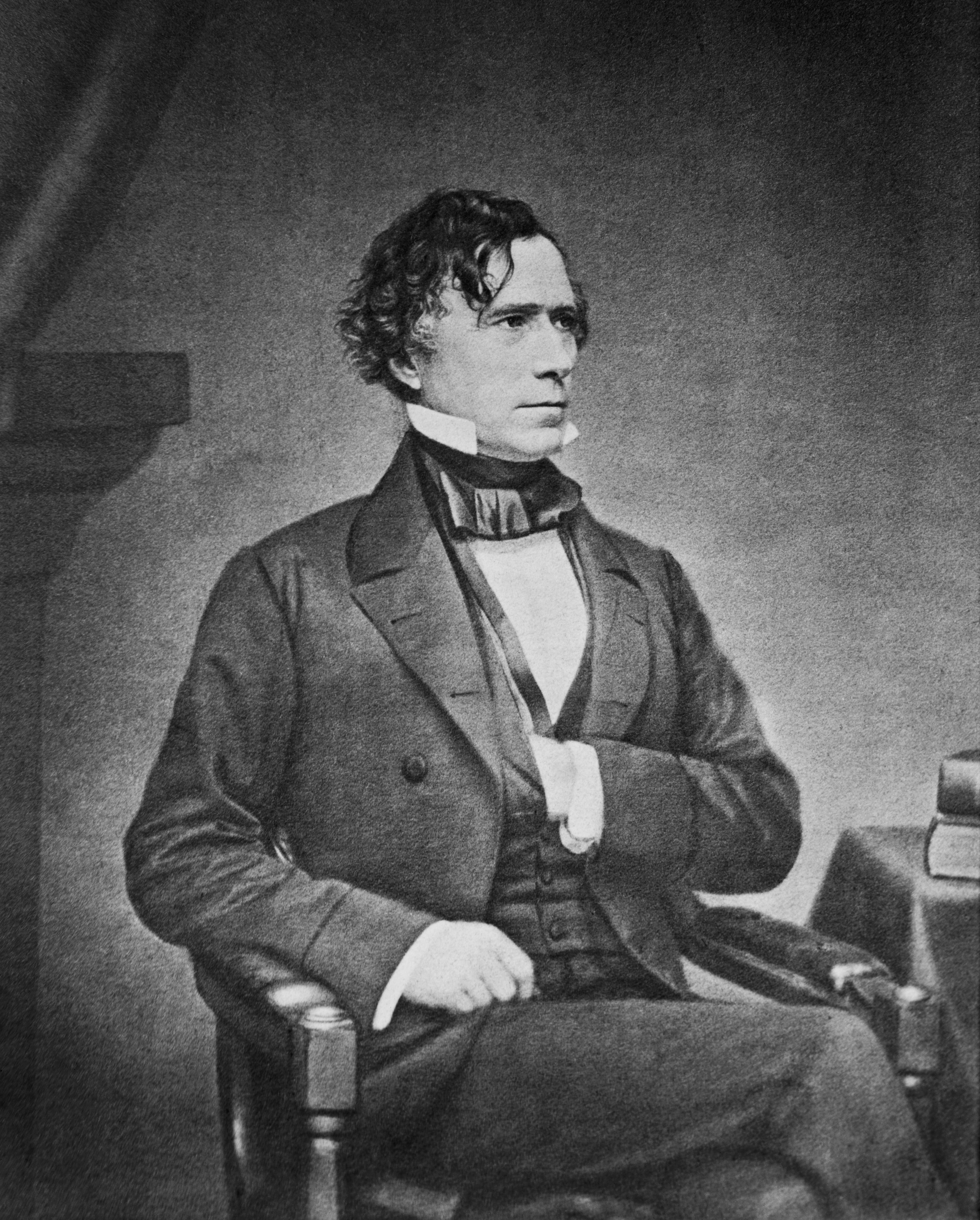
Cropped portrait of Franklin Pierce, U.S. president (photograph ca. 1855-1865 by Mathew Brady).

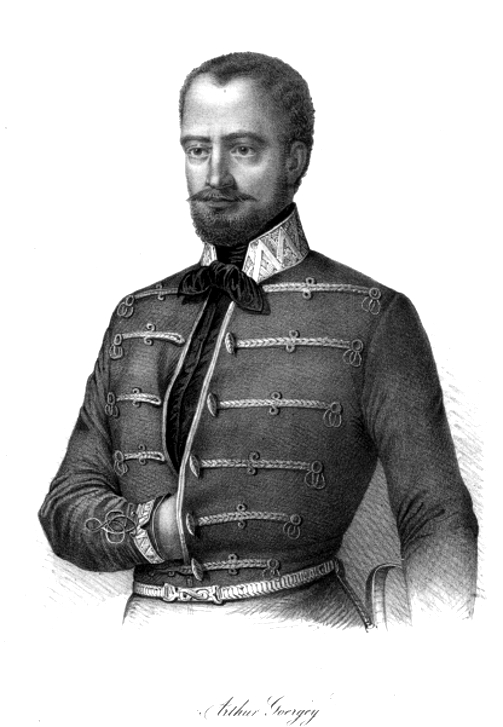
Artúr Görgei, Hungarian general

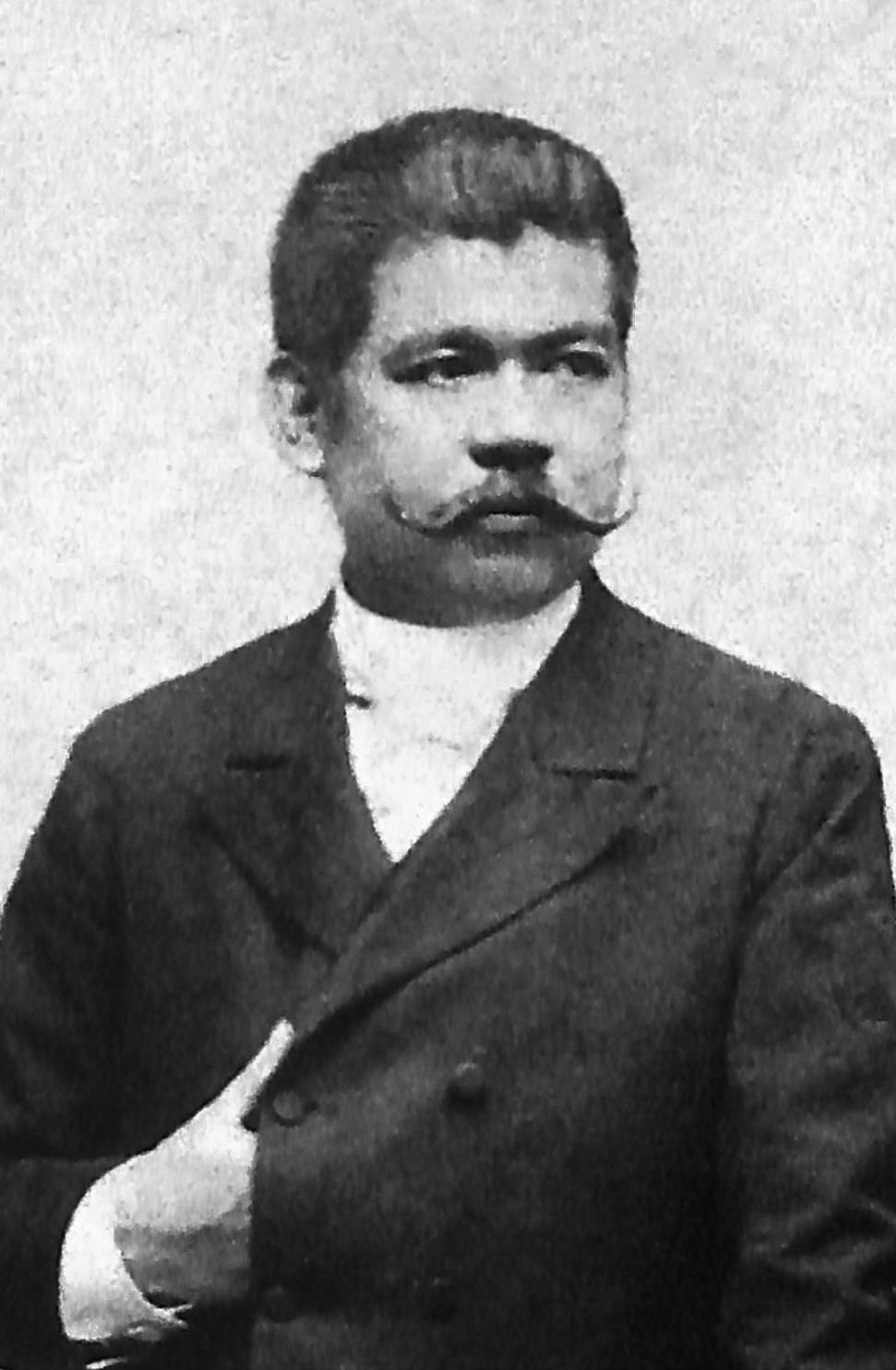
Portrait of Marcelo H. del Pilar, Filipino lawyer and journalist (photograph taken ca. 1890 in Madrid).

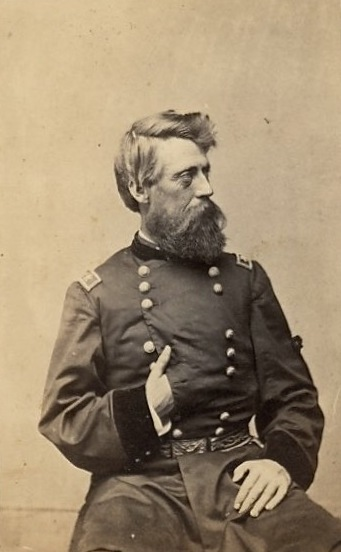
Jefferson Columbus Davis, US officer

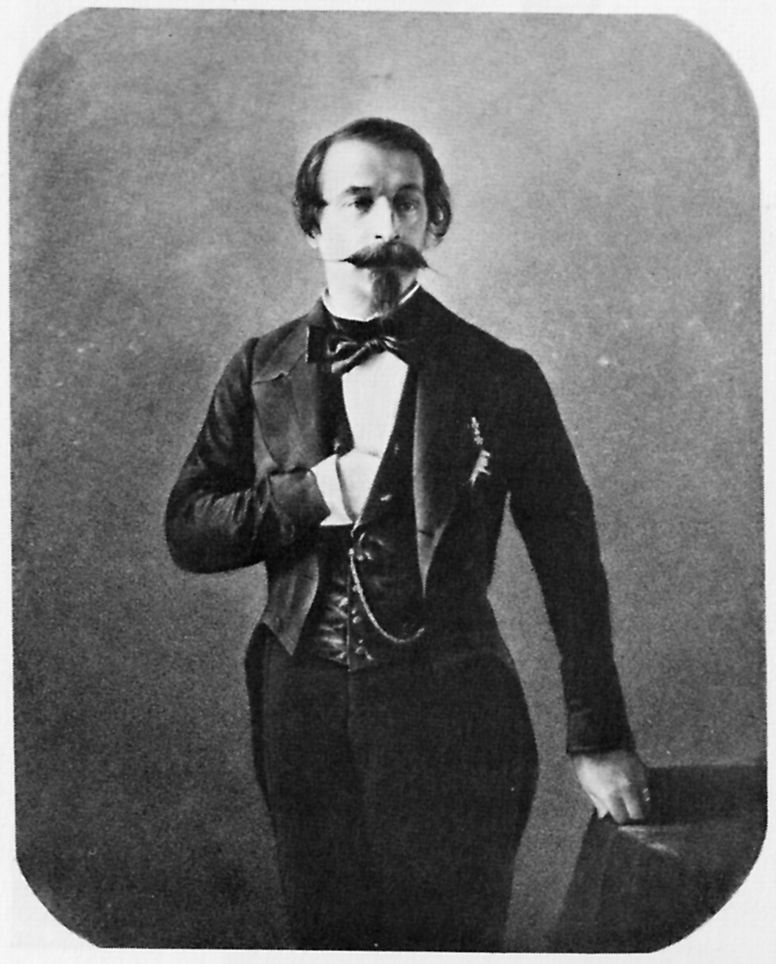
Napoléon III

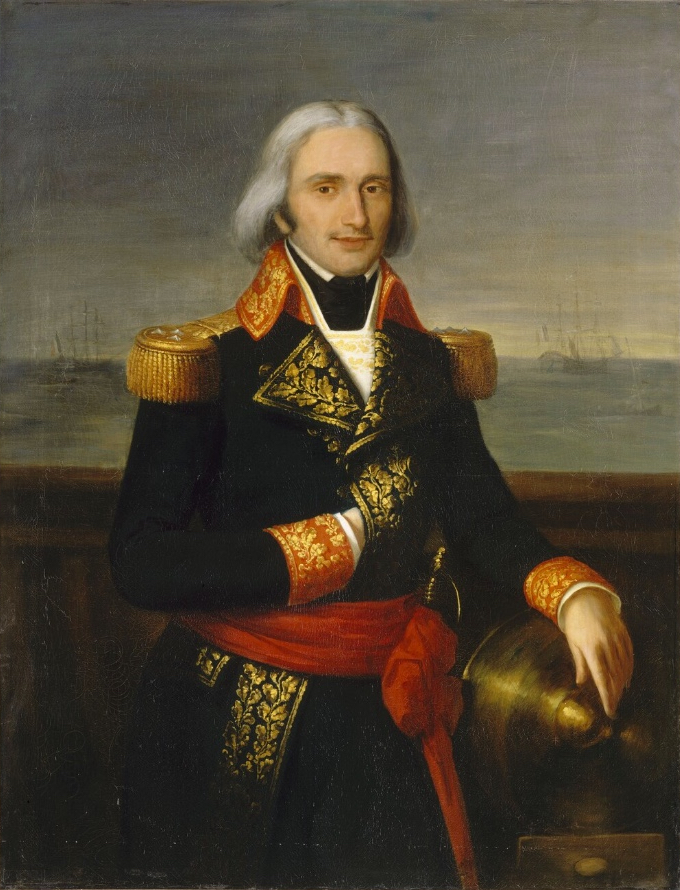
François-Paul Brueys d'Aigalliers, French admiral

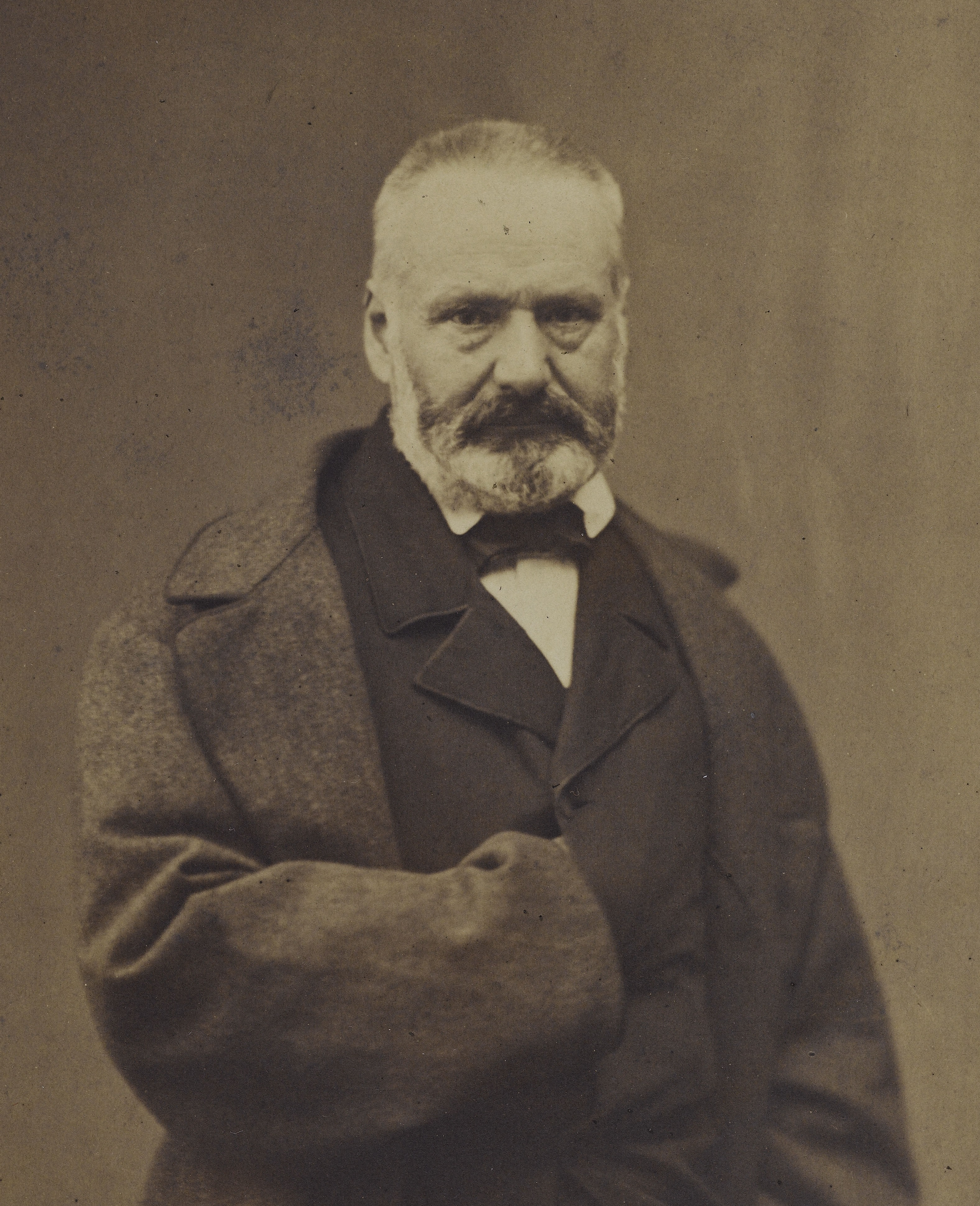
Victor Hugo

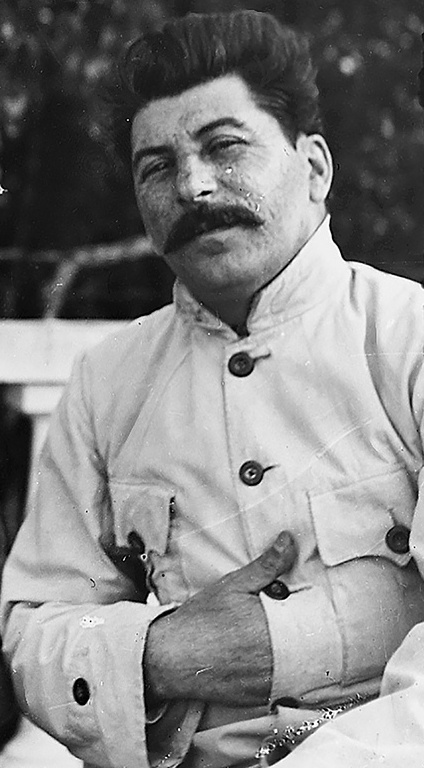
Joseph Stalin
