= The Emperor Napoleon in His Study at the Tuileries =

1812 painting by Jacques-Louis David

- Artist: Jacques-Louis David
- Year: 1812
- Medium: Oil on canvas
- Dimensions: 203.9 cm × 125.1 cm (80.3 in × 49.3 in)
- Location: National Gallery of Art, Washington, D.C.

The Emperor Napoleon in His Study at the Tuileries (French: Napoléon dans son cabinet de travail aux Tuileries) is an 1812 painting by Jacques-Louis David. It shows Napoleon I, Emperor of the French in uniform in his study at the Tuileries Palace. Despite the detail, it is unlikely that Napoleon posed for the portrait.

It was a private commission from the Scottish nobleman and admirer of Napoleon, Alexander Hamilton, 10th Duke of Hamilton in 1811 and completed in 1812. Originally shown at Hamilton Palace, it was sold to Archibald Primrose, 5th Earl of Rosebery in 1882, from whom it was bought by the Samuel H. Kress Foundation in 1954, which deposited it in Washington D.C.'s National Gallery of Art, where it now hangs.

== Iconography ==
Vertical in format, it shows Napoleon standing, three-quarters life size, wearing the uniform of a colonel of the Imperial Guard Foot Grenadiers (blue with white facings and red cuffs). He also wears his Legion of Honour and Order of the Iron Crown decorations, along with gold epaulettes, white French-style culottes and white stockings. His face is turned towards the viewer and his right hand is in his jacket.

Piled on the desk are a pen, several books, dossiers and rolled papers. More rolled papers and a map are on the green carpet to the left of the desk – on these papers is the painter's signature LVD^{ci} DAVID OPVS 1812. All this, along with Napoleon's unbuttoned cuffs, wrinkled stockings, disheveled hair, the flickering candles and the time on the clock (4:13 am) are all meant to imply he has been up all night, writing laws such as the Code Napoléon – the word "Code" is prominent on the rolled papers on the desk. This maintains his new civil rather than heroic (as in Canova's Napoleon as Mars the Peacemaker) or military (as in David's own Napoleon Crossing the Alps) image, though the sword on the chair's armrest still refers back to his military successes. The fleurs-de-lys and heraldic bees also imply the stability of the imperial dynasty.

== Development ==
An analysis of the original painting reveals that the artist reedited the composition and details several times to balance the image, add allusions, and capture a complete story.

Brush strokes and texture indicate that an earlier version had Napoleon's upper body flanked by two fluted columns about the width of the figure's torso. These strong vertical elements would have created a distraction from the central figure.

These columns were revised to a carved panel in shadow (on the viewer's left) and a clock with a large face (viewer's right) on level with and somewhat larger than the figure's face. The clock was later repainted with a smaller face moved up and to the right, with the clock body still covering the underlying column brush strokes.

These revisions greatly improved the compositional balance of the painting's upper section, reducing the impression of three vertical columns. They successfully moved the viewer's focus to Napoleon's face and expression and away from the presumably accurate stature and middle-heavy build.

The change also allowed incorporating additional symbology, most notably the time (4:13).

Other revisions were added symbols on the table items and lower section, many painted over fleurs-de-lis which are conspicuously rare in the final image.

During the time of painting David also "produced a reptition, where the time on the long-case clock in the background was changed from 4.13 to 4.00 and Napoleon wore the hunter-green uniform of a Colonel of the Chasseurs à cheval (Cavalry) of the Imperial Guard".

== See also ==
- List of paintings by Jacques-Louis David
