= History of U.S. foreign policy, 1829–1861 =

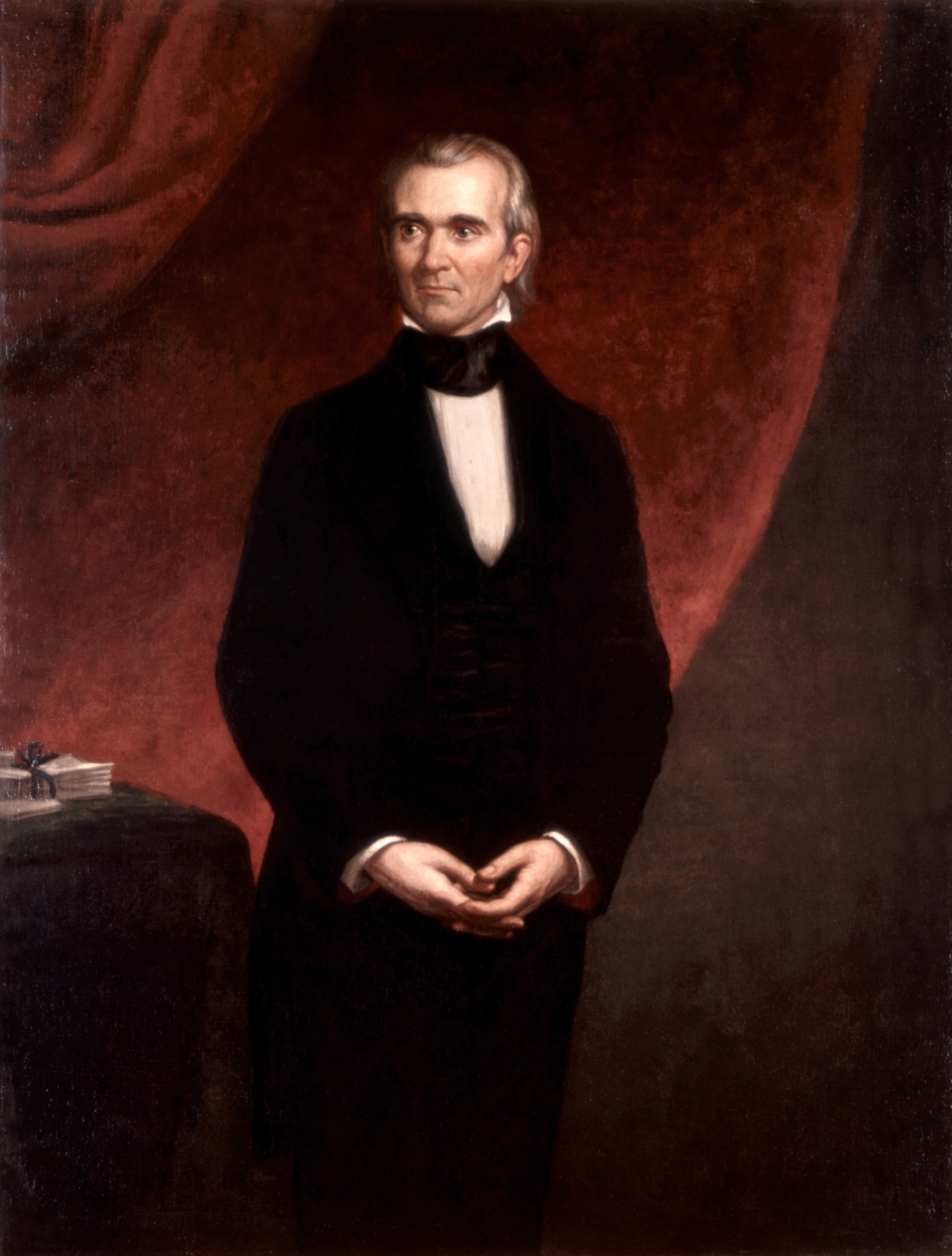
President James K. Polk directed U.S. foreign policy from 1845 to 1849

The history of U.S. foreign policy from 1829 to 1861 concerns the foreign policy of the United States during the presidential administrations of Andrew Jackson, Martin Van Buren, William Henry Harrison, John Tyler, James K. Polk, Zachary Taylor, Millard Fillmore, Franklin Pierce, and James Buchanan. During this era, the United States annexed the Republic of Texas, acquired the Mexican Cession by defeating Mexico in the Mexican–American War and partitioned Oregon Country with the United Kingdom of Great Britain and Ireland. The period began with the inauguration of Jackson in 1829, while the onset of the American Civil War in 1861 marked the start of the next period in U.S. foreign policy.

Jackson's foreign policy focused on expanding trade and settling spoliation claims, and he reached an agreement with Britain to open Canadian and Caribbean ports to U.S. trade. After gaining independence from Mexico in 1835, the Republic of Texas sought annexation by the United States, but President Jackson and President Van Buren both opposed annexation due to fears of stirring up sectional unrest. Texas had been settled by many American slave-owners, and many anti-slavery Northerners were opposed to adding a new slave state; others opposed annexation because they believed it would lead to war with Mexico. Nonetheless, President Tyler made the annexation of Texas the chief goal of his presidency, and it became a major campaign issue in the 1844 presidential election. After Polk's victory in the election, the United States annexed Texas, and tensions at the Texas–Mexico border led to the outbreak of the Mexican–American War in 1846. The U.S. defeated Mexico in the war, and gained control of the Mexican provinces of Alta California and the New Mexico through the Treaty of Guadalupe Hidalgo.

Tensions with Britain escalated after the outbreak of the Canadian Rebellions of 1837–1838, but President Van Buren and General Winfield Scott avoided war despite several incidents. In 1842, Britain and the United States agreed to the Webster–Ashburton Treaty, thereby resolving several border issues. The two countries agreed to partition Oregon Country at the 49th parallel north in the 1846 Oregon Treaty. In 1853, the borders of the present-day contiguous United States took their current shape when the United States and Mexico agreed to the Gadsden Purchase. The Polk, Pierce, and Buchanan administrations sought to gain control of the Spanish colony of Cuba, but opposition from both Spain and domestic anti-slavery elements ensured that it remained part of Spain. The United States expanded its influence in the Pacific Ocean throughout the 1840s and 1850s, and in 1842 President Tyler announced that the U.S. would oppose European colonization of the Hawaiian Islands. The Perry Expedition of 1853–1854 opened trade with Japan and ultimately set the Meiji Restoration in motion.

== Leadership ==
=== Jackson administration, 1829–1837 ===
Democrat Andrew Jackson took office in 1829 after defeating incumbent president John Quincy Adams in the 1828 presidential election. For the key position of secretary of state, Jackson chose Martin Van Buren of New York. Jackson inaugural cabinet suffered from bitter partisanship and gossip, especially between Secretary of War John Eaton, Vice President John C. Calhoun and Van Buren. In 1831, Senator Edward Livingston of Louisiana became secretary of state and former Congressman Louis McLane of Delaware took the position of Secretary of the Treasury. At the start of his second term, Jackson transferred McLane to the position of secretary of state. McLane resigned in 1834 and was replaced by John Forsyth of Georgia. Aside from the issue of Texas, foreign affairs under Jackson were generally uneventful, and his administration's foreign policy focused on expanding trade opportunities for American commerce.

According to Jonathan Goldstein, Jackson was the first presidency to actively promote export and import opportunities with Asia. Secretary of the Navy Levi Woodbury, diplomat Edmund Roberts and several navy commodores took the lead. The Navy landed Marines in Sumatra and the Fiji islands to punish attacks on American merchant ships. The Navy charted hazardous Pacific zones. the State Department sent Roberts to conclude treaties to protect American trade.

=== Van Buren administration, 1837–1841 ===
Jackson's preferred successor, Martin Van Buren, took office in 1837 after winning the 1836 presidential election. Van Buren retained many of Jackson's appointees, including Secretary of State John Forsyth. Though he gave his other Cabinet members a high level of autonomy, Van Buren was closely involved in foreign affairs and matters pertaining to the Treasury Department.

=== Harrison and Tyler administrations, 1841–1845 ===
Whig William Henry Harrison became president in 1841 after defeating Van Buren in the 1840 presidential election. He died just one month into office and was succeeded by John Tyler. In September 1841, every member of the Cabinet except for Secretary of State Daniel Webster resigned after Tyler voted a bill to re-establish a national bank. With his domestic agenda frustrated in Congress, Tyler worked with Secretary of State Webster to pursue an ambitious foreign policy. Webster struggled with his role in the Whig Party and the Tyler administration, and he finally resigned from the Cabinet in May 1843. Abel Upshur replaced Webster as secretary of state, and he focused on Tyler's priority of annexing the Republic of Texas. After Upshur was killed in a naval accident in early 1844, Tyler brought in John C. Calhoun as secretary of state.

Henry Wheaton, the minister to Prussia, 1835–46, negotiated a commercial reciprocity treaty with the German Zollverein, or economic union. The union covered Prussia and eighteen smaller states. The treaty called for a reciprocal lowering of tariffs, especially on American tobacco and on German lard and German manufactured items. All the members of the Zollverein assented to the treaty, and it was signed on March 25, 1844. However the Senate Committee on Foreign Relations reported, June 14, 1844, against ratification and it never went into effect. Senators disliked having tariff rates fixed by treaty rather than by legislation. Britain lobbied against it and Prussia lacked a diplomat in Washington. President Tyler was unpopular, and some American mercantile interests were opposed.

=== Polk administration, 1845–1849 ===
Democrat James K. Polk took office in 1845 after defeating Whig Henry Clay in the 1844 presidential election. Polk appointed James Buchanan as secretary of state; Polk respected Buchanan's opinion and Buchanan played an important role in Polk's presidency, but the two often clashed over foreign policy and appointments. The Polk administration pursued an expansionist foreign policy focused on the acquisition of western territories.

=== Taylor and Fillmore administrations, 1849–1853 ===
Whig Zachary Taylor took office in 1849 after defeating Democrat Lewis Cass in the 1848 presidential election. Taylor asked John J. Crittenden to serve as secretary of state, but Crittenden insisted on serving out the Governorship of Kentucky to which he had just been elected, and Taylor instead appointed Senator John M. Clayton of Delaware, a close associate of Crittenden's. Taylor and his secretary of state, John M. Clayton, both lacked diplomatic experience, and came into office at a relatively uneventful time in American–international politics. Their shared nationalism allowed Taylor to devolve foreign policy matters to Clayton with minimal oversight, although no decisive foreign policy was established under their administration. Taylor died in 1850 and was succeeded by Millard Fillmore; Taylor's cabinet appointees all submitted their resignation shortly after Fillmore took office. Fillmore appointed Daniel Webster as secretary of state, and Webster became Fillmore's most important adviser. Fillmore appointed Edward Everett as secretary of state after Webster died in 1852.

=== Pierce administration, 1853–1857 ===
Democrat Franklin Pierce took office in 1853 after defeating Whig Winfield Scott in the 1852 presidential election. Pierce appointed William L. Marcy as secretary of state; Marcy had previously served as Secretary of War under President Polk. The Pierce administration fell in line with the expansionist Young America movement, with William L. Marcy leading the charge as secretary of state. Marcy sought to present to the world a distinctively American, republican image. He issued a circular recommending that U.S. diplomats wear "the simple dress of an American citizen" instead of the elaborate diplomatic uniforms worn in the courts of Europe, and that they only hire American citizens to work in consulates. Marcy received international praise for his 73-page letter defending Austrian refugee Martin Koszta, who had been captured abroad in mid-1853 by the Austrian government despite his intention to become a U.S. citizen.

=== Buchanan administration, 1857–1861 ===
Democrat James Buchanan took office in 1857 after defeating Pierce at the 1856 Democratic National Convention and subsequently winning the 1856 presidential election. Anticipating that his administration would concentrate on foreign policy and that Buchanan himself would largely direct foreign policy, he appointed the aging Lewis Cass as secretary of state. Cass would become marginalized in Buchanan's administration, with Buchanan and Assistant Secretary of State John Appleton instead directing foreign affairs.

== Spoliation and commercial treaties ==
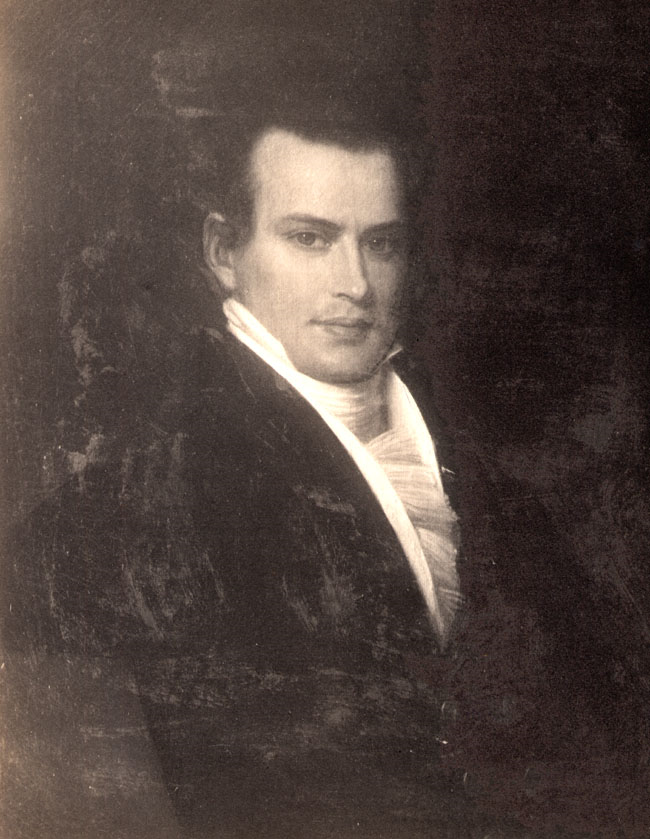
Jackson's Minister to France William C. Rives successfully negotiated payments that France owed the U.S. for damages caused by Napoleon.

The Jackson administration negotiated a trade agreement with Great Britain that opened the British West Indies and Canada to American exports, though the British refused to allow American ships to engage in the West Indian carrying trade. The agreement with Britain, which had been sought by previous presidents, represented a major foreign policy success for Jackson. The State Department also negotiated routine trade agreements with Russia, Spain, the Ottoman Empire, and Siam. American exports (chiefly cotton) increased 75%, while imports increased 250%. Jackson increased funding to the navy and used it to defend American commercial interests in far-flung areas such as the Falkland Islands and Sumatra.

A second major foreign policy emphasis in the Jackson administration was the settlement of spoliation claims. The most serious crisis involved a debt that France owed for the damage Napoleon had done two decades earlier. France agreed to pay the debt, but kept postponing payment. Jackson made warlike gestures, while domestic political opponents ridiculed his bellicosity. Jackson's Minister to France William C. Rives finally obtained the ₣ 25,000,000 francs involved (about $5,000,000) in 1836. The Department of State also settled smaller spoliation claims with Denmark, Portugal, and Spain.

The Tyler administration negotiated a commercial treaty with the Zollverein, a customs union of German states. The treaty lowered German duties on goods such as cotton and tobacco, and was particularly advantageous to Southern and Western interests. The treaty was considered at the same time that the Senate debated a treaty to annex Texas, and the hostile Whig Senate refused to ratify either treaty.

== Relations with Britain, 1829–1845 ==
=== Canadian rebellions ===
British subjects in Lower Canada and Upper Canada rose in rebellion in 1837 and 1838, protesting their lack of responsible government. While the initial insurrection in Upper Canada ended with the December 1837 Battle of Montgomery's Tavern, many of the rebels fled across the Niagara River into New York, and Canadian leader William Lyon Mackenzie began recruiting volunteers in Buffalo. Mackenzie declared the establishment of the Republic of Canada and put into motion a plan whereby volunteers would invade Upper Canada from Navy Island on the Canadian side of the Niagara River. Several hundred volunteers traveled to Navy Island in the weeks that followed, procuring the steamboat Caroline to deliver supplies to Navy Island. Seeking to deter an imminent invasion, British forces crossed to the American bank of the river in late December 1837, and they burned and sank the Caroline. In the melee, one American was killed and others were wounded. Considerable sentiment arose within the United States to declare war, and a British ship was burned in revenge.

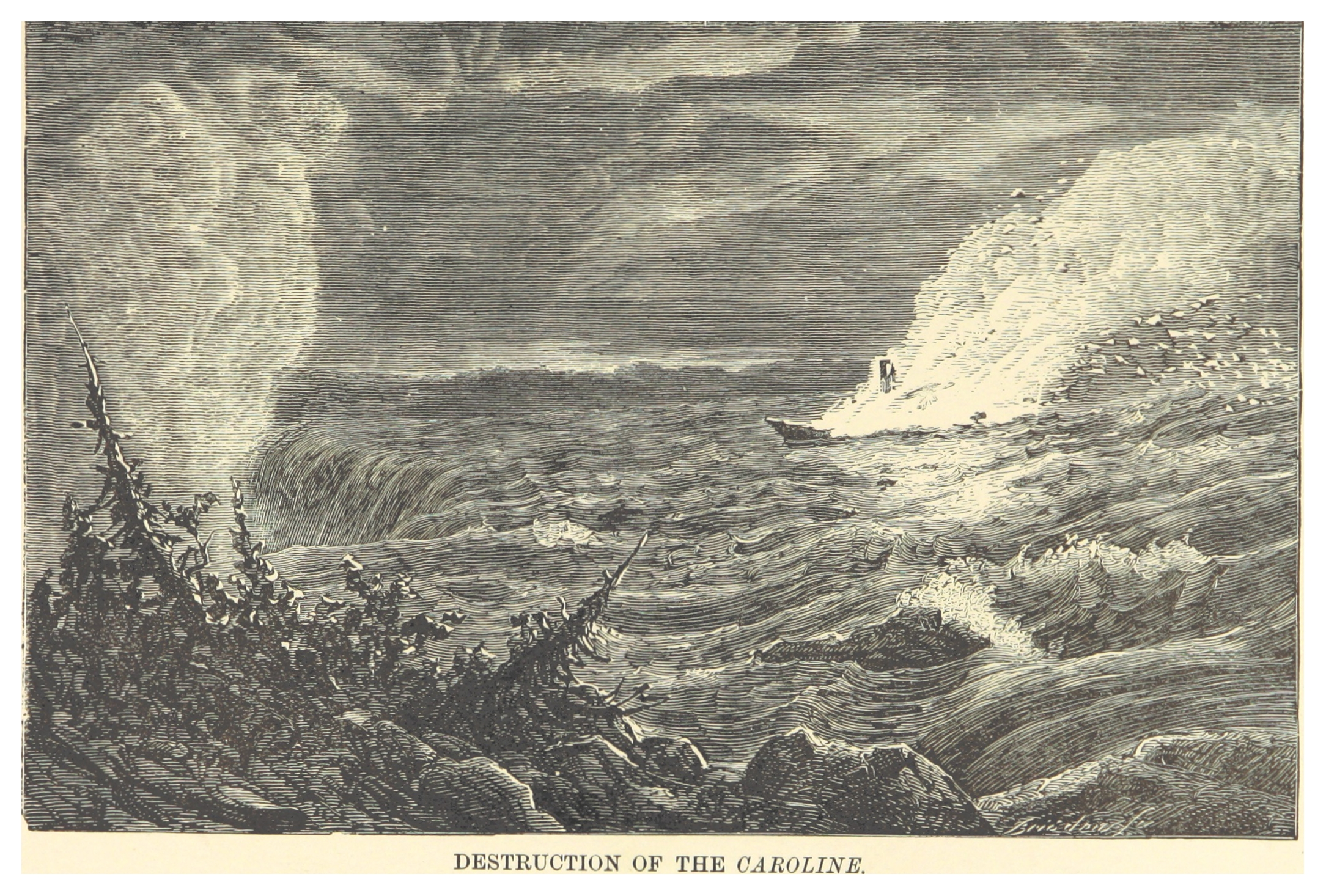
"Destruction of the Caroline", illustration by John Charles Dent (1881)

Van Buren, looking to avoid a war with Great Britain, sent General Winfield Scott to the border with large discretionary powers for its protection and its peace. Scott impressed upon American citizens the need for a peaceful resolution to the crisis, and made it clear that the U.S. government would not support adventuresome Americans attacking the British. In early January 1838, the president proclaimed U.S. neutrality with regard to the Canadian independence issue, a declaration which Congress endorsed by passing a neutrality law designed to discourage the participation of American citizens in foreign conflicts.

Though Scott was able to calm the situation, a group of secret societies known as "Hunters' Lodges" continued to seek the overthrow of British rule in Canada. These groups carried out several attacks in Upper Canada, collectively known as the Patriot War. The administration followed through on its enforcement of the Neutrality Act, encouraged the prosecution of filibusters, and actively deterred U.S. citizens from subversive activities abroad. After the failure of two filibuster expeditions in late 1839, the Hunters' Lodges lost their popular appeal and the Patriot War came to an end. In the long term, Van Buren's opposition to the Patriot War contributed to the construction of healthy Anglo–American and U.S.–Canadian relations in the 20th century; it also led, more immediately, to a backlash among citizens regarding the supposed overreach of federal authority.

=== Aroostook conflict ===
A new crisis between Britain and the United States surfaced in late 1838 in disputed territory on the Maine–New Brunswick frontier. Jackson had been willing to drop American claims to the region in return for other concessions, but Maine was unwilling to drop its claims to the disputed territory. For their part, the British considered possession of the area vital to the defense of Canada. Both American and New Brunswick lumberjacks cut timber in the disputed territory during the winter of 1838–39. On December 29, New Brunswick lumbermen were spotted cutting down trees on an American estate near the Aroostook River. After American woodcutters rushed to stand guard, a shouting match, known as the Battle of Caribou, ensued. Tensions quickly boiled over into a near war with both Maine and New Brunswick arresting each other's citizens, and the crisis seemed ready to turn into an armed conflict.

British troops began to gather along the Saint John River. Governor John Fairfield mobilized the state militia to confront the British in the disputed territory and several forts were constructed. The American press clamored for war; "Maine and her soil, or BLOOD!" screamed one editorial. "Let the sword be drawn and the scabbard thrown away!" In June, Congress authorized 50,000 troops and a $10 million budget in the event foreign military troops crossed into United States territory. Van Buren was unwilling to go to war over the disputed territory, though he assured Maine that he would respond to any attacks by the British. To settle the crisis, Van Buren met with the British minister to the United States, and Van Buren and the minister agreed to resolve the border issue diplomatically. Van Buren also sent General Scott to the northern border area, both to show military resolve, and more importantly, to lower the tensions. Scott successfully convinced all sides to submit the border issue to arbitration.

=== Webster–Ashburton Treaty ===
During his time in the Tyler administration, Secretary of State Webster sought to conclude a major treaty with Great Britain to bring an end to simmering tensions between the two countries. Anglo-American diplomatic relations had reached a low point in the aftermath of the Caroline affair and the Aroostook War of the late 1830s. Webster and other Whig leaders favored closer relations with Britain in order to spur British investment in the ailing U.S. economy, while Tyler pursued a conciliatory policy with the British in order to win their acquiescence to the U.S. annexation of Texas. As part of this conciliatory policy, Tyler administration launched a secret propaganda campaign to influence public opinion in favor of an Anglo-American treaty that would settle the border between Maine and Canada. That issue, which had not been settled in the Treaty of Paris or the Treaty of Ghent, had strained relations between the United States and Britain for decades.

British diplomat Lord Ashburton arrived in Washington in April 1842, and after months of negotiations the United States and Britain agreed to the Webster–Ashburton Treaty in August 1842. Delegates from Maine, who had been invited by Webster to ensure that state's support, somewhat reluctantly agreed to support the treaty. The treaty clearly delineated Maine's Northern border, as well as other sections of the U.S.-Canada border that had been in dispute. The treaty also included a pledge by the United States to step up enforcement against the Atlantic slave trade.

Senator Thomas Hart Benton led Senate opposition to the treaty, arguing that it "needlessly and shamelessly" relinquished American territory, but few others joined Benton in resisting the treaty. The Webster–Ashburton Treaty won Senate ratification in a 39-to-9 vote, and it became popular among Americans, although few from either party gave Tyler credit for it. The treaty represented an important point in the growing warmth of Anglo-American relations after the War of 1812, as it showed that both countries accepted joint control of North America. American expansionists would instead focus on Mexico, while the British government under Robert Peel was freed to turn its attention to domestic and European issues.

== Texas ==
=== Independence and recognition ===
Jackson believed that Adams had bargained away rightfully American territory in the Adams–Onís Treaty, and he sought to expand the United States west. He continued Adams's policy of attempting to purchase the Mexican state of Coahuila y Tejas, which Mexico continued to rebuff. Upon gaining independence, Mexico had invited American settlers to that underdeveloped province, and 35,000 American settlers moved to the state between 1821 and 1835. Most of the settlers came from the Southern United States, and many of these settlers brought slaves with them. In 1830, fearing that the state was becoming a virtual extension of the United States, Mexico banned immigration into Coahuila y Tejas. Chafing under Mexican rule, the American settlers became increasingly dissatisfied.

In 1835, American settlers in Texas, along with local Tejanos, fought a war for independence against Mexico. Texan leader Stephen F. Austin sent a letter to Jackson pleading for an American military intervention, but the United States remained neutral in the conflict. By May 1836, the Texans had routed the Mexican military, establishing an independent Republic of Texas. The new Texas government sought recognition from President Jackson and annexation into the United States. Antislavery elements in the U.S. strongly opposed annexation because of slavery's presence in Texas. Jackson was reluctant to recognize Texas, as he was unconvinced that the new republic would maintain its independence from Mexico and did not want to make Texas an anti-slavery issue during the 1836 election. After the 1836 election, Jackson formally recognized the Republic of Texas, and nominated Alcée Louis la Branche as chargé d'affaires.

Boldly reversing Jackson's policies, Van Buren sought peace abroad and harmony at home. He proposed a diplomatic solution to a long-standing financial dispute between American citizens and the Mexican government, rejecting Jackson's threat to settle it by force. Likewise, when the Texas minister at Washington, D.C., proposed annexation to the administration in August 1837, he was told that the proposition could not be entertained. Constitutional scruples and fear of war with Mexico were the reasons given for the rejection, but concern that it would precipitate a clash over the extension of slavery undoubtedly influenced Van Buren and continued to be the chief obstacle to annexation. Northern and Southern Democrats followed an unspoken rule in which Northerners helped quash anti-slavery proposals and Southerners refrained from agitating for the annexation of Texas. Texas withdrew the annexation offer in 1838. Mexico, meanwhile, continued to regard Texas as a breakaway province.

=== Tyler administration ===
In early 1843, having completed the Webster–Ashburton treaty and other diplomatic efforts, Tyler shifted his administration's focus to Texas. Tyler replaced Webster with Abel Upshur, who believed that Britain sought to convince Texas to abolish slavery in a complicated scheme designed to undermine the interests of the Southern United States. Though the government of British prime minister Robert Peel in fact had little interest in pushing abolitionism in Texas, the fear of such a scheme motivated Upshur to pursue annexation as quickly as possible in order to preserve slavery in Texas. Tyler and Upshur began quiet negotiations with the Texas government, promising military protection from Mexico in exchange for a commitment to annexation. Secrecy was necessary, as the Constitution required congressional approval for such military commitments. Upshur planted rumors of possible British designs on Texas to drum up support among Northern voters, who were wary of admitting a new pro-slavery state. Texas leaders, meanwhile, were reluctant to sign any annexation treaty that might be rejected by the U.S. Senate. Despite the continued skepticism of Texan leaders, the negotiators finalized the terms of an annexation treaty before the end of February 1844. Under the terms of the treaty, Texas would join as a territory with statehood to follow later, and the United States would assume both the public lands and the public debt of Texas.

After Upshur died in early 1844, Tyler appointed Senator John C. Calhoun as his secretary of state. In the eyes of Northerners, Calhoun was the symbol of Nullification and efforts to extend slavery, and his appointment undercut Tyler's attempts to disassociate the issue of Texas from the issue of slavery. In April 1844, Calhoun and two Texas negotiators signed the treaty providing for the annexation of Texas. When the text of the annexation treaty was leaked to the public, it met opposition from the Whigs, who would oppose anything that might enhance Tyler's status, as well as from foes of slavery and those who feared a confrontation with Mexico, which had announced that it would view annexation as a hostile act by the United States. Both Clay and Van Buren, the respective frontrunners for the Whig and Democratic nominations, decided to come out against annexation. Knowing this, when Tyler sent the treaty to the Senate for ratification in April 1844, he did not expect it to pass. The full Senate began to debate the Senate annexation treaty in mid-May 1844, and it rejected the treaty by a vote of 16–35 on June 8. Most of the support for the treaty came from Democrats who represented slave states.

Changing tactics, Tyler submitted the treaty to the House of Representatives. He hoped to convince Congress to annex Texas by joint resolution, which required a simple majority vote in both houses of Congress rather than a two-thirds vote in the Senate. The debate over Texas, as well as Oregon to a lesser degree, dominated American political discourse throughout mid-1844. Former president Andrew Jackson, a staunch supporter of annexation, persuaded 1844 Democratic presidential nominee James K. Polk to welcome Tyler back into the Democratic Party and ordered Democratic editors to cease their attacks on him. Satisfied by these developments, Tyler dropped out of the race in August and endorsed Polk for the presidency. During the 1844 campaign, Democrats like Robert Walker recast the issue of Texas annexation, arguing that Texas and as Oregon were rightfully American but had been lost during the Monroe administration. In response, Clay argued that the annexation of Texas would bring war with Mexico and increase sectional tensions. Ultimately, Polk triumphed in an extremely close election, defeating Clay 170–105 in the Electoral College; the flip of just a few thousand voters in New York would have given the election to Clay.

=== Annexation of Texas ===
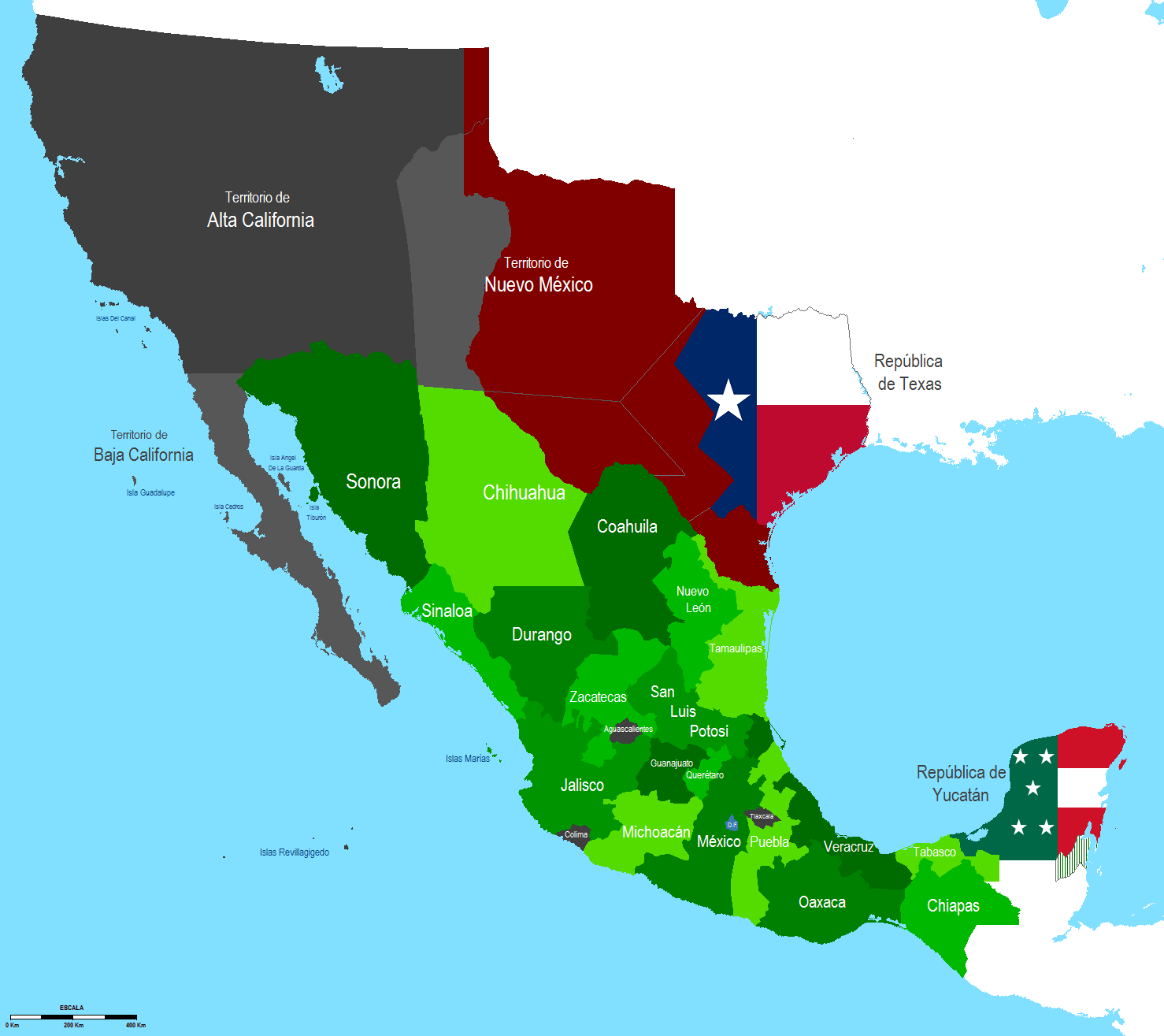
Map of Mexico in 1845, with the Republic of Texas, the Republic of Yucatan and the disputed territory between Mexico and Texas in red. Mexico claimed to own all of Texas.

After the election, Tyler announced in his annual message to Congress that "a controlling majority of the people and a large majority of the states have declared in favor of immediate annexation." Congress debated annexation between December 1844 and February 1845. Polk's arrival in Washington, and his support for immediate annexation, helped unite Democrats behind Tyler's proposal to annex Texas by joint resolution. In late February 1845, the House by a substantial margin and the Senate by a bare 27–25 majority approved a joint resolution offering terms of annexation to Texas. Every Democratic senator voted for the bill, as did three Southern Whig senators. On March 1, three days before the end of his term, Tyler signed the annexation bill into law. The bill allowed the president to either re-open annexation negotiations or to extend an offer of statehood. It differed from Tyler's proposed treaty in that the United States would not take on the public lands or the public debt of Texas.

Polk's first major decision in office was whether to recall Tyler's emissary to Texas, who bore an offer of annexation based on that act of Congress. Though it was within Polk's power to recall the messenger, he chose to allow the emissary to continue, with the hope that Texas would accept the offer. Polk also retained the United States Ambassador to Texas, Andrew Jackson Donelson, who sought to convince the Texan leaders to accept annexation under the terms proposed by the Tyler administration. Though public sentiment in Texas favored annexation, some Texas leaders disliked the strict terms for annexation, which offered little leeway for negotiation and gave public lands to the federal government. Nonetheless, in July 1845, a convention in Austin, Texas, ratified the annexation of Texas. In December 1845, Polk signed a resolution annexing Texas, and Texas became the 28th state in the union. The annexation of Texas would lead to increased tensions with Mexico, which had never recognized Texan independence.

== Mexican–American War ==
=== Background ===
The United States had been the first country to recognize Mexico's independence following the Mexican War of Independence, but relations between the two countries began to sour in the 1830s. In the 1830s and 1840s, the United States, like France and Britain, sought a reparations treaty with Mexico for various acts committed by Mexican citizens and authorities, including the seizure of American ships. Though the United States and Mexico had agreed to a joint board to settle the various claims prior to Polk's presidency, many Americans accused the Mexican government of acting in bad faith in settling the claims. For its part, Mexico believed that the United States sought to acquire Mexican territory, and believed that many Americans filed specious or exaggerated claims. The already-troubled Mexico–United States relations were further inflamed by the possibility of the annexation of Texas, as Mexico still viewed Texas as an integral part of their republic. Additionally, Texas laid claim to all land north of the Rio Grande River, while Mexico argued that the more northern Nueces River was the proper Texan border. Though the United States had a population more than twice as numerous and an economy thirteen times greater than that of Mexico, Mexico was not prepared to give up its claim to Texas, even if it meant war.

The Mexican province of Alta California enjoyed a large degree of autonomy, and the central government neglected its defenses; a report from a French diplomat stated that "whatever nation chooses to send there a man-of-war and 200 men" could conquer California. Polk placed great value in the acquisition of California, which represented new lands to settle as well as a potential gateway to trade in Asia. He feared that the British or another European power would eventually establish control over California if it remained in Mexican hands. In late 1845, Polk sent diplomat John Slidell to Mexico to win Mexico's acceptance of the Rio Grande border. Slidell was further authorized to purchase California for $20 million and New Mexico for $5 million. Polk also sent Lieutenant Archibald H. Gillespie to California with orders to foment a pro-American rebellion that could be used to justify annexation of the territory.

=== Outbreak of war ===
Following the Texan ratification of annexation in 1845, both Mexicans and Americans saw war as a likely possibility. Polk began preparations for a potential war, sending an army led by General Zachary Taylor into Texas. Taylor and Commodore David Conner of the U.S. Navy were both ordered to avoid provoking a war, but were authorized to respond to any Mexican breach of peace. Though Mexican president José Joaquín de Herrera was open to negotiations, Slidell's ambassadorial credentials were refused by a Mexican council of government. In December 1845, Herrera's government collapsed largely due to his willingness to negotiate with the United States; the possibility of the sale of large portions of Mexico aroused anger among both Mexican elites and the broader populace.

As successful negotiations with the unstable Mexican government appeared unlikely, Secretary of War Marcy ordered General Taylor to advance to the Rio Grande River. Polk began preparations to support a potential new government led by the exiled Mexican General Antonio López de Santa Anna with the hope that Santa Anna would sell parts of California. Polk had been advised by Alejandro Atocha, an associate of Santa Anna, that only the threat of war would allow the Mexican government the leeway to sell parts of Mexico. In March 1846, Slidell finally left Mexico after the government refused his demand to be formally received. Slidell returned to Washington in May 1846, and gave his opinion that negotiations with the Mexican government were unlikely to be successful. Polk regarded the treatment of his diplomat as an insult and an "ample cause of war", and he prepared to ask Congress for a declaration of war.

Meanwhile, in late March 1846, General Taylor reached the Rio Grande, and his army camped across the river from Matamoros, Tamaulipas. In April, after Mexican general Pedro de Ampudia demanded that Taylor return to the Nueces River, Taylor began a blockade of Matamoros. A skirmish on the northern side of the Rio Grande ended in the death or capture of dozens of American soldiers, and became known as the Thornton Affair. While the administration was in the process of asking for a declaration of war, Polk received word of the outbreak of hostilities on the Rio Grande. In a message to Congress, Polk explained his decision to send Taylor to the Rio Grande, and stated that Mexico had invaded American territory by crossing the river. Polk contended that a state of war already existed, and he asked Congress to grant him the power to bring the war to a close. Polk's message was crafted to present the war as a just and necessary defense of the country against a neighbor that had long troubled the United States. In his message, Polk noted that Slidell had gone to Mexico to negotiate a recognition of the Texas annexation, but did not mention that he also sought the purchase of California.

Some Whigs, such as Abraham Lincoln, challenged Polk's version of events. One Whig congressman declared "the river Nueces is the true western boundary of Texas. It is our own president who began this war. He has been carrying it on for months." Nonetheless, the House overwhelmingly approved of a resolution authorizing the president to call up fifty thousand volunteers. In the Senate, war opponents led by Calhoun also questioned Polk's version of events, but the House resolution passed the Senate in a 40–2 vote, marking the beginning of the Mexican–American War. Many congressmen who were skeptical about the wisdom of going to war with Mexican feared that publicly opposing the war would cost them politically.

=== Early war ===
Overview map of the war. Key: Disputed territory United States territory, 1848 / Mexican territory retained after the Treaty of Guadalupe Hidalgo Mexican territory lost in the Treaty of Guadalupe Hidalgo

In May 1846, Taylor led U.S. forces in the inconclusive Battle of Palo Alto, the first major battle of the war. The next day, Taylor led the army to victory in the Battle of Resaca de la Palma, eliminating the possibility of a Mexican incursion into the United States. Taylor's force moved south towards Monterrey, which served as the capital of the province of Nuevo León. In the September 1846 Battle of Monterrey, Taylor defeated a Mexican force led by Ampudia, but allowed Ampudia's forces to withdraw, much to Polk's consternation.

Meanwhile, Winfield Scott, the army's lone major general at the outbreak of the war, was offered the position of top commander in the war. Polk, War Secretary Marcy, and Scott agreed on a strategy in which the US would capture northern Mexico and then pursue a favorable peace settlement. However, Polk and Scott experienced mutual distrust from the beginning of their relationship, in part due to Scott's Whig affiliation and former rivalry with Andrew Jackson. Additionally, Polk sought to ensure that both Whigs and Democrats would serve in important positions in the war, and was offended when Scott suggested otherwise; Scott also angered Polk by opposing Polk's effort to increase the number of generals. Having been alienated from Scott, Polk ordered Scott to remain in Washington, leaving Taylor in command of Mexican operations. Polk also ordered Commodore Conner to allow Santa Anna to return to Mexico from his exile, and sent an army expedition led by Stephen W. Kearny towards Santa Fe.

While Taylor fought the Mexican army in east, U.S. forces took control of California and New Mexico. Army Captain John C. Frémont led settlers in Northern California in an attack on the Mexican garrison in Sonoma, beginning the Bear Flag Revolt. In August 1846, American forces under Kearny captured Santa Fe, capital of the province of New Mexico. He captured Santa Fe without firing a shot, as the Mexican governor, Manuel Armijo, fled from the province. After establishing a provisional government in New Mexico, Kearny took a force west to aid in the conquest of California. After Kearny's departure, Mexicans and Puebloans rebelled against the provisional government in the Taos Revolt, but U.S. forces crushed the uprising. At roughly the same time that Kearny captured Santa Fe, Commodore Robert F. Stockton landed in Los Angeles and proclaimed the capture of California. Californios rose up in rebellion against U.S. occupation, but Stockton and Kearny suppressed the revolt with a victory in the Battle of La Mesa. After the battle, Kearny and Frémont became embroiled in a dispute over the establishment of a government in California. The controversy between Frémont and Kearny led to a break between Polk and the powerful Missouri Senator Thomas Hart Benton, who was the father-in-law of Frémont.

=== Wilmot Proviso ===
Whig opposition to the war grew after 1845, while some Democrats lost their initial enthusiasm. In August 1846, Polk asked Congress to appropriate $2 million (~$62.3 million in 2024) in hopes of using that money as a down payment for the purchase of California in a treaty with Mexico. Polk's request ignited opposition to the war, as Polk had never before made public his desire to annex parts of Mexico (aside from lands claimed by Texas). A freshman Democratic Congressman, David Wilmot of Pennsylvania, offered an amendment known as the Wilmot Proviso that would ban slavery in any newly acquired lands. The appropriations bill, including the Wilmot Proviso, passed the House with the support Northern Whigs and Northern Democrats, breaking the normal pattern of partisan division in congressional votes. Wilmot himself held anti-slavery views, but many pro-slavery Northern Democrats voted for the bill out of anger at Polk's perceived bias towards the South. The partition of Oregon, the debate over the tariff, and Van Buren's antagonism towards Polk all contributed to Northern anger. The appropriations bill, including the ban on slavery, was defeated in the Senate, but the Wilmot Proviso injected the slavery debate into national politics.

=== Late war ===
Santa Anna returned to Mexico City in September 1846, declaring that he would fight against the Americans. With the duplicity of Santa Anna now clear, and with the Mexicans declining his peace offers, Polk ordered an American landing in Veracruz, the most important Mexican port on the Gulf of Mexico. As a march from Monterrey to Mexico City was implausible due to rough terrain, Polk had decided that a force would land in Veracruz and then march on Mexico City. Taylor was ordered to remain near Monterrey, while Polk reluctantly chose Winfield Scott to lead the attack on Veracruz. Though Polk continued to distrust Scott, Marcy and the other cabinet members prevailed on Polk to select the army's most senior general for the command.

In March 1847, Polk learned that Taylor had ignored orders and had continued to march south, capturing the northern Mexican town of Saltillo. Taylor's army had repulsed a larger Mexican force, led by Santa Anna, in the February 1847 Battle of Buena Vista. Taylor won acclaim for the result of the battle, but the theater remained inconclusive. Rather than pursuing Santa Anna's forces, Taylor withdrew back to Monterrey. Meanwhile, Scott landed in Veracruz and quickly won control of the city. Following the capture of Veracruz, Polk dispatched Nicholas Trist, Buchanan's chief clerk, to negotiate a peace treaty with Mexican leaders. Trist was ordered to seek the cession of Alta California, New Mexico, and Baja California, recognition of the Rio Grande as the southern border of Texas, and American access across the Isthmus of Tehuantepec.

In April 1847, Scott defeated a Mexican force led by Santa Anna at the Battle of Cerro Gordo, clearing the way for a march on Mexico City. In August, Scott defeated Santa Anna again at the Battle of Contreras and the Battle of Churubusco. With these victories over a larger force, Scott's army was positioned to besiege Mexico's capital. Santa Anna negotiated a truce with Scott, and the Mexican foreign minister notified Trist that they were ready to begin negotiations to end the war. However, the Mexican and American delegations remained far apart on terms; Mexico was only willing to yield portions of Alta California, and still refused to agree to the Rio Grande border. While negotiations continued, Scott captured the Mexican capital in the Battle for Mexico City.

In the United States, a heated political debate emerged regarding how much of Mexico the United States should seek to annex, with Whigs such as Henry Clay arguing that the United States should only seek to settle the Texas border question, and some expansionists arguing for the annexation of all of Mexico. Frustrated by the lack of progress in negotiations, and troubled by rumors that Trist was willing to negotiate on the Rio Grande border, Polk ordered Trist to return to Washington. Polk decided to occupy large portions of Mexico and wait for a Mexican peace offer. In late 1847, Polk learned that Scott had court-martialed a close ally of Polk's, Gideon Johnson Pillow. Outraged by that event, Polk demanded Scott's return to Washington, with William Orlando Butler tapped as his replacement.

=== Peace: the Treaty of Guadalupe Hidalgo ===
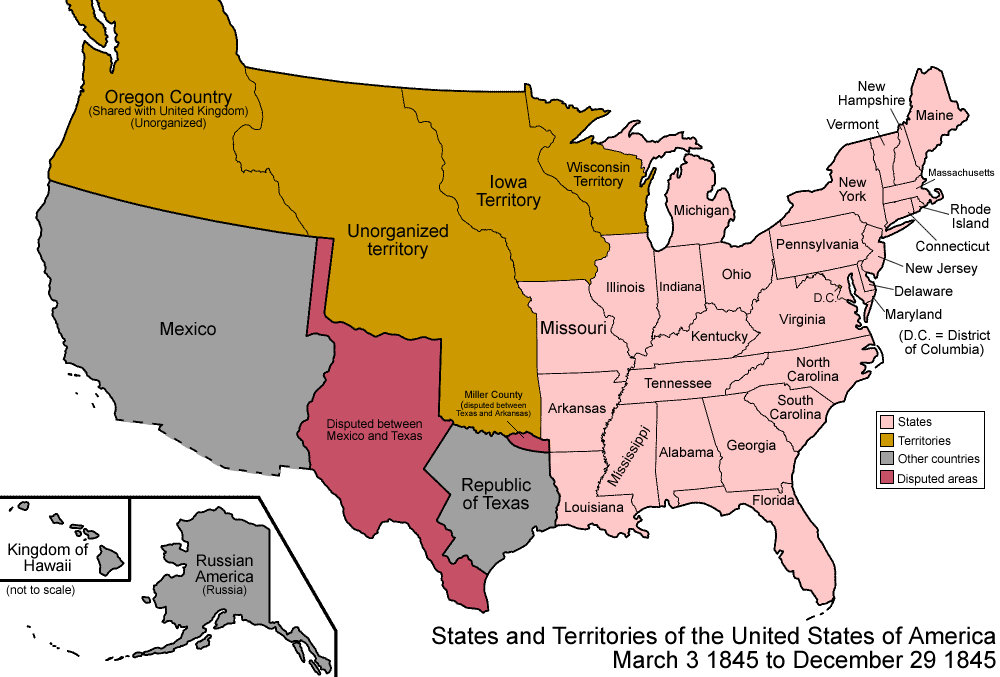
United States states and territories when Polk entered office

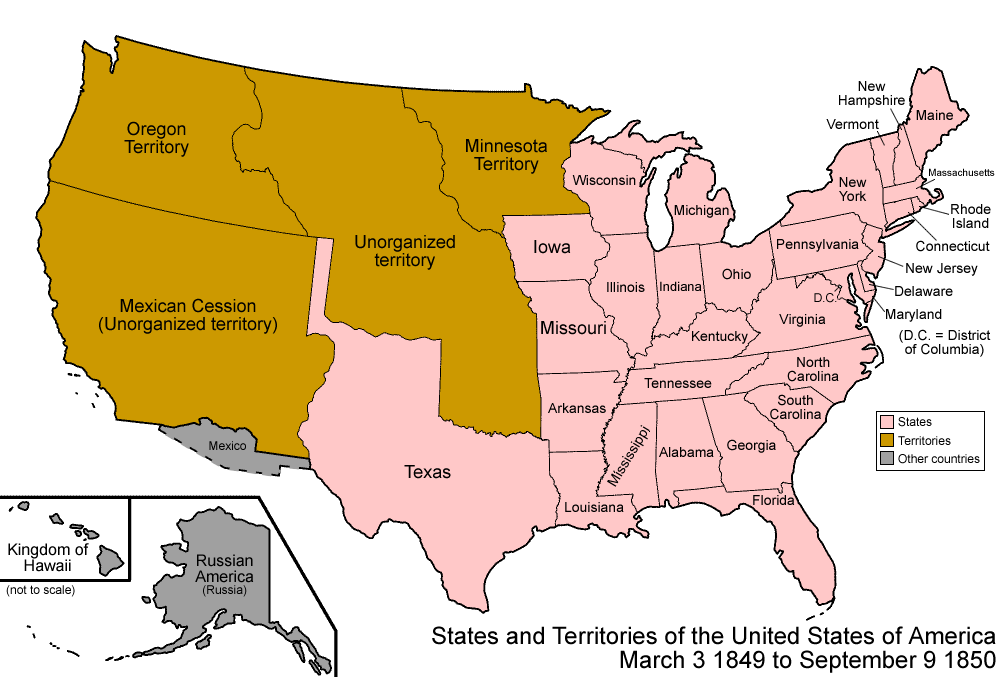
United States states and territories when Polk left office

In September 1847, Manuel de la Peña y Peña replaced Santa Anna as President of Mexico, and Pena and his Moderado allies showed a willingness to negotiate based on the terms Polk had relayed to Trist. In November 1847, Trist received Polk's order to return to Washington. After a period of indecision, and with the backing of Scott and the Mexican government (which was aware that Polk had ordered Trist's recall), Trist decided to enter into negotiations with the Mexican government. As Polk had made no plans to send an envoy to replace him, Trist thought that he could not pass up the opportunity to end the war on favorable terms. Though Polk was outraged by Trist's decision, he decided to allow Trist some time to negotiate a treaty.

Throughout January 1848, Trist regularly met with Mexican officials in Guadalupe Hidalgo, a small town north of Mexico City. Trist was willing to allow Mexico to keep Lower California, but successfully haggled for the inclusion of the important harbor of San Diego in a cession of Upper California. The Mexican delegation agreed to recognize the Rio Grande border, while Trist agreed to have the United States cover prior American claims against the Mexican government. The two sides also agreed to the right of Mexicans in annexed territory to leave or become U.S. citizens, American responsibility to prevent cross-border Indian raids, protection of church property, and a $15 million payment to Mexico. On February 2, 1848, Trist and the Mexican delegation signed the Treaty of Guadalupe Hidalgo.

Polk received the document on February 19, and, after the Cabinet met on the 20th, decided he had no choice but to accept it. If he turned it down, with the House by then controlled by the Whigs, there was no assurance Congress would vote funding to continue the war. Both Buchanan and Walker dissented, wanting more land from Mexico. Some senators opposed the treaty because they wanted to take no Mexican territory; others hesitated because of the irregular nature of Trist's negotiations. Polk waited in suspense for two weeks as the Senate considered it, sometimes hearing that it would likely be defeated, and that Buchanan and Walker were working against it. On March 10, the Senate ratified the treaty in a 38–14 vote that cut across partisan and geographic lines. The Senate made some modifications to treaty, and Polk worried that the Mexican government would reject the new terms. Despite those fears, on June 7, Polk learned that Mexico had ratified the treaty. Polk declared the treaty in effect as of July 4, 1848, thus ending the war.

The Mexican Cession added 600,000 square miles of territory to the United States, including a long Pacific coastline. The treaty also recognized the annexation of Texas and acknowledged American control over the disputed territory between the Nueces River and the Rio Grande. Mexico, in turn, received $15 million. The war had cost the lives of nearly 14,000 Americans and 25,000 Mexicans, and had cost the United States roughly one hundred million dollars. With the exception of the territory acquired by the 1853 Gadsden Purchase, the territorial acquisitions under Polk established the modern borders of the Contiguous United States.

== Relations with Britain, 1845–1861 ==
=== Oregon ===
The Tyler administration sought a treaty with the British regarding the partition of Oregon Country, which the two countries had jointly occupied since the signing of the Treaty of 1818. Britain and the United States had intermittently engaged in discussions over a partition of the territory, but had been unable to come to an agreement. The British favored extending the U.S.-Canadian border west along the 49th parallel north until it met the Columbia River, at which point that river would serve as the boundary. For the U.S., a major goal was the acquisition of a deepwater port site in the Puget Sound; the lone deepwater port site in the region lay north of the Columbia River but south of the 49th parallel. Tyler also believed that the acquisition of part of the territory would help make the simultaneous annexation of Texas more palatable to Northerners. As more and more Americans traveled along the Oregon Trail to settle in Oregon Country, the status of the territory became an increasingly important issue. Some Americans, like Charles Wilkes of the United States Exploring Expedition, favored claiming the entire territory, which extended up to the 54°40′ parallel. Tyler's enthusiasm for an agreement with Britain regarding Oregon was not shared by Upshur and Calhoun, both of whom focused on the annexation of Texas. Acquisition of the territory would become a major campaign issue in the 1844 election, with many expansionists calling for expansion of the entire territory.

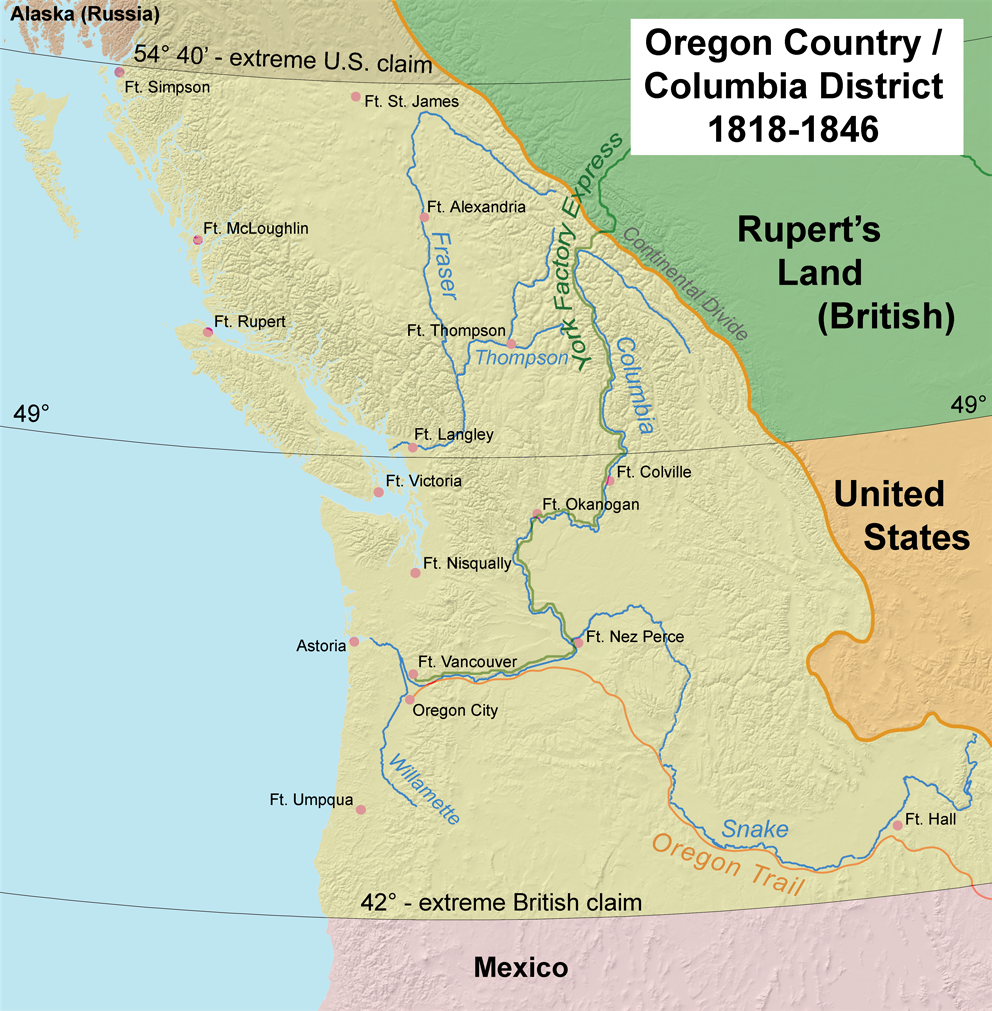
Map of Oregon Country, which the Oregon Treaty split between the Americans and British at the 49th parallel

Negotiations over Oregon continued under the Polk administration. Though both the British and the Americans sought an acceptable compromise regarding Oregon Country, each also saw the territory as an important geopolitical asset that would play a large part in determining the dominant power in North America. In his inaugural address, Polk announced that he viewed the American claim to the land as "clear and unquestionable", provoking threats of war from British leaders should Polk attempt to take control of the entire territory. Polk had refrained in his address from asserting a claim to the entire territory, which extended north to 54 degrees, 40 minutes north latitude, although the Democratic Party platform called for such a claim. Despite Polk's hawkish rhetoric, he viewed war with the British as unwise, and Polk and Buchanan opened up negotiations with the British. Like his predecessors, Polk again proposed a division along the 49th parallel, which was immediately rejected by Pakenham. Secretary of State Buchanan was wary of a two-front war with Mexico and Britain, but Polk was willing to risk war with both countries in pursuit of a favorable settlement.

In his December 1845 annual message to Congress, Polk requested approval of giving Britain a one-year notice (as required in the Treaty of 1818) of his intention to terminate the joint occupancy of Oregon. In that message, he quoted from the Monroe Doctrine to denote America's intention of keeping European powers out, the first significant use of it since its origin in 1823. After much debate, Congress eventually passed the resolution in April 1846, attaching its hope that the dispute would be settled amicably. When the British Foreign Secretary, Lord Aberdeen, learned of the proposal rejected by Pakenham, Aberdeen asked the United States to re-open negotiations, but Polk was unwilling to do so unless a proposal was made by the British.

With Britain moving towards free trade with the repeal of the Corn Laws, good trade relations with the United States were more important to Aberdeen than a distant territory. In February 1846, Polk allowed Buchanan to inform Louis McLane, the American ambassador to Britain, that Polk's administration would look favorably on a British proposal based around a division at the 49th parallel. In June 1846, Pakenham presented an offer to the Polk administration, calling for a boundary line at the 49th parallel, with the exception that Britain would retain all of Vancouver Island, and British subjects would be granted limited navigation rights on the Columbia River until 1859. Polk and most of his cabinet were prepared to accept the proposal, but Buchanan, in a reversal, urged that the United States seek control of all of the Oregon Territory.

After winning the reluctant approval of Buchanan, Polk submitted the full treaty to the Senate for ratification. The Senate ratified the Oregon Treaty in a 41–14 vote, with opposition coming from those who sought the full territory. Polk's willingness to risk war with Britain had frightened many, but his tough negotiation tactics may have gained the United States concessions from the British (particularly regarding the Columbia River) that a more conciliatory president might not have won.

=== Clayton–Bulwer Treaty ===
Arguably the Taylor administration's definitive accomplishment in foreign policy was the Clayton–Bulwer Treaty of 1850, regarding a proposed inter-oceanic canal through Central America. While the U.S. and Britain were on friendly terms, and the construction of such a canal was decades away from reality, the mere possibility put the two nations in an uneasy position. For several years, Britain had been seizing strategic points, particularly the Mosquito Coast on the eastern coast of present-day Nicaragua. Negotiations were held with Britain that resulted in the landmark Clayton–Bulwer Treaty. Both nations agreed not to claim control of any canal that might be built in Nicaragua. The treaty promoted development of an Anglo-American alliance; its completion was Taylor's last action as president.

=== Pierce administration ===
During Pierce's presidency, relations with the United Kingdom were tense due to disputes over American fishing rights in Canada and U.S. and British ambitions in Central America. Marcy completed a trade reciprocity agreement with British minister to Washington, John Crampton, which would reduce the need for British naval patrols in Canadian waters. The treaty, which Pierce saw as a first step towards the American annexation of Canada, was ratified in August 1854. While the administration negotiated with Britain over the Canada–U.S. border, U.S. interests were also threatened in Central America, where the Clayton–Bulwer Treaty of 1850 had failed to keep Britain from expanding its influence. Secretary of State Buchanan sought to persuade Britain to relinquish their territories in Central America.

Seeking to ensure friendly relations with the United States during the Crimean War, the British were prepared to renounce most of their claims in Central America, but an incident in the British-protected port of Greytown soured Anglo-American relations. The murder of an employee of an American company led Pierce to order the USS Cyane to Greytown, and Cyane destroyed Greytown. Despite the destruction of Greytown and American filibusters in Central America, British merchants strongly opposed any war with the United States, ensuring that no war broke out between the two countries. Buchanan's successor as ambassador to Britain, George M. Dallas, concluded a treaty with Britain in which the British agreed to withdrawal from Greytown and most other Central American territories in return for U.S. recognition of British interests in Belize, but the Senate did not ratify the agreement.

== Expansionism in the 1850s ==
=== Gadsden Purchase ===
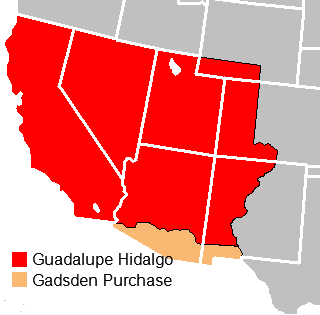
A map of the lands ceded by Mexico in the 1848 Treaty of Guadalupe Hidalgo and the 1853 Gadsden Purchase

Secretary of War Jefferson Davis, an advocate of a southern transcontinental railroad route, persuaded President Pierce to send rail magnate James Gadsden to Mexico to buy land for a potential railroad. Gadsden was also charged with re-negotiating provisions of the Treaty of Guadalupe Hidalgo which required the U.S. to prevent Native American raids into Mexico from New Mexico Territory. Pierce authorized Gadsden to negotiate a treaty offering $50 million for large portions of Northern Mexico, including all of Baja California. Gadsden ultimately concluded a less far-reaching treaty with Mexican president Antonio López de Santa Anna in December 1853, purchasing a portion of the Mexican state of Sonora. Negotiations were nearly derailed by William Walker's unauthorized expedition into Mexico, and so a clause was included charging the U.S. with combating future such attempts. Other provisions in the treaty included U.S. assumption of all private claims by American citizens against the Mexican government, and American access to the Isthmus of Tehuantepec for transit. Pierce was disappointed by the treaty, and Gadsden would later claim that, if not for Walker's expedition, Mexico would have ceded the Baja California Peninsula and more of the state of Sonora.

The treaty received a hostile reception from northern congressmen, many of whom saw it as another move designed to benefit the Slave Power. Congress reduced the Gadsden Purchase to the region now comprising southern Arizona and part of southern New Mexico; the original treaty had ceded a port on the Gulf of California to the United States. Congress also reduced the amount of money being paid to Mexico from $15 million to $10 million, and included a protection clause for a private citizen, Albert G. Sloo, whose interests were threatened by the purchase. Pierce opposed the use of the federal government to prop up private industry and did not endorse the final version of the treaty, which was ratified nonetheless. The acquisition brought the contiguous United States to its present-day boundaries, excepting later minor adjustments.

=== Cuba ===
In mid-1848, President Polk authorized his ambassador to Spain, Romulus Mitchell Saunders, to negotiate the purchase of Cuba and offer Spain up to $100 million, an astounding sum at the time for one territory, equal to $3.72 billion in present-day terms. Cuba was close to the United States and had slavery, so the idea appealed to Southerners but was unwelcome in the North. However, Spain was still making huge profits in Cuba (notably in sugar, molasses, rum, and tobacco), and thus the Spanish government rejected Saunders' overtures. Though Polk was eager to acquire Cuba, he refused to support the proposed filibuster expedition of Narciso López, who sought to invade and annex Cuba.

Like many of his predecessors, Pierce hoped to annex the Spanish island of Cuba, which possessed wealthy sugar plantations, held a strategic position in the Caribbean Sea, and represented the possibility of a new slave state. Pierce appointed Young America adherent Pierre Soulé as his minister to Spain, and Soulé quickly alienated the Spanish government. After the Black Warrior Affair, in which the Spanish seized a U.S. merchant ship in Havana, the Pierce administration contemplated invading Cuba or aiding a filibuster expedition with the same intent, but the administration ultimately decided on focusing its efforts on the purchase of Cuba from Spain. Ambassadors Soulé, Buchanan, and John Y. Mason drafted a document that proposed to purchase Cuba from Spain for $120 million (USD), but also attempted to justify the "wresting" of Cuba from Spain if the offer were refused. The document, essentially a position paper meant only for the consumption of the Pierce administration, did not offer any new thinking on the U.S. position towards Cuba and Spain, and was not intended to serve as a public edict. Nonetheless, the publication of the Ostend Manifesto provoked the scorn of northerners who viewed it as an attempt to annex a slave-holding possession. Publication of the document helped discredit the expansionist policy of Manifest Destiny the Democratic Party had often supported.

=== Buchanan ===
Buchanan entered the White House with an ambitious foreign policy centered around establishing U.S. hegemony over Central America at the expense of Great Britain. He hoped to re-negotiate the Clayton–Bulwer Treaty, which he viewed as a mistake that limited U.S. influence in the region. He also sought to establish American protectorates over the Mexican states of Chihuahua and Sonora, partly to serve as a destination for Mormons. Aware of the decrepit state of the Spanish Empire, he hoped to finally achieve his long-term goal of acquiring Cuba, where state slavery still flourished. After long negotiations with the British, he convinced them to agree to cede the Bay Islands to Honduras and the Mosquito Coast to Nicaragua. However, Buchanan's ambitions in Cuba and Mexico were blocked in the House of Representatives, where the anti-slavery forces strenuously opposed any move to acquire new slave territory. Buchanan also considered buying Alaska from the Russian Empire, possibly as a colony for Mormon settlers, but the U.S. and Russia were unable to agree upon a price.

=== Other U.S. efforts ===
Pierce attempted to purchase Samaná Bay from the Dominican Republic, since he feared that the Dominican Republican's instability would lead it to an alliance with France or Spain. The Dominican insistence on protection of the rights of Dominican citizens in the United States "without distinction of race or colour" prevented any Dominican-American treaty from being reached. The Pierce administration explored the possibility of annexing the Hawaiian Kingdom, but King Kamehameha III's insistence on full citizenship for all Hawaiian citizens regardless of race precluded any possibility of annexation during Pierce's presidency.

In 1856, Congress passed the Guano Islands Act, which allowed U.S. citizens to take possession of unclaimed islands containing guano deposits. Guano, the accumulated excrement of seabirds, was valuable as a fertilizer. Long after Pierce left office, the act would be used to make claims on several territories, including the Midway Atoll.

=== Filibusters ===
Throughout 1849 and 1850, the Taylor administration contended with Narciso López, a Venezuelan radical who led repeated filibustering expeditions in an attempt to conquer the island of Cuba. López made generous offers to American military leaders to support him, but Taylor and Clayton saw the enterprise as illegal. They issued a blockade, and later, authorized a mass arrest of López and his fellows, although the group would eventually be acquitted. They also confronted Spain, which had arrested several Americans on the charge of piracy, but the Spaniards eventually surrendered them to maintain good relations with the U.S.

Fillmore ordered federal authorities to attempt to prevent López from launching a third expedition, and proclaimed that his administration would not protect anyone captured by Spain. López's third expedition ended in total failure, as the Cuban populace once again refused to rally to their would-be liberator. López and several Americans, including the nephew of Attorney General Crittenden, were executed by the Spanish, while another 160 Americans were forced to work in Spanish mines. Fillmore, Webster and the Spanish government worked out a series of face-saving measures, including the release of the American prisoners, that settled a brewing crisis between the two countries. Following the crisis, Britain and France offered a three-party treaty in which all signatories would agree to uphold Spanish control of Cuba, but Fillmore rejected the offer. Many Southerners, including Whigs, had supported the filibusters, and Fillmore's consistent opposition to the filibusters further divided his party as the 1852 election approached.

== Pacific, 1829–1861 ==
President Adams, had attempted to launch a scientific oceanic exploration in 1828, but Congress was unwilling to fund the effort. When Jackson assumed office in 1829 he pocketed Adams' expedition plans. However, wanting to establish a presidential legacy similar to that of Jefferson, who had sponsored the Lewis and Clark Expedition, Jackson decided to support scientific exploration during his second term. On May 18, 1836, Jackson signed a law creating and funding the oceanic United States Exploring Expedition. The return of the United States Exploring Expedition in 1842 stimulated American interest in trade with Asia. Tyler sought to establish an American harbor on the Pacific Ocean either in the Puget Sound or in San Francisco, but his administration was unable to establish undisputed control over either territory. Webster attempted to convince the British to pressure Mexico to sell San Francisco, but neither the British nor the Mexicans were interested in this proposal.

At Webster's urging, Tyler announced in 1842 that the U.S. would oppose colonization of the Hawaiian islands by any European power. Previous administrations had shown little interest in the Hawaiian Islands, but American traders had become influential in the islands, which held an important location in Pacific trade. This policy, which effectively extended the Monroe Doctrine to Hawaii, became known as the Tyler Doctrine. France under Napoleon III sought to annex Hawaii, but backed down after Fillmore issued a strongly worded message warning that "the United States would not stand for any such action." The U.S. also signed a secret treaty with King Kamehameha III of Hawaii which stipulated that the U.S. would gain sovereignty over Hawaii in case of war. Although many in Hawaii and the U.S. desired the annexation of Hawaii as U.S. state, the U.S. was unwilling to grant full citizenship to Hawaii's non-white population.

Eager to compete with Great Britain in international markets, Tyler sent lawyer Caleb Cushing to China, where Cushing negotiated the terms of the 1844 Treaty of Wanghia. The treaty, which was the first bilateral accord between the United States and China, contributed to greatly expanded trade between the two countries in subsequent years. Despite not taking direct part in the Second Opium War, the Buchanan administration won trade concessions in the 1858 Treaty of Tientsin. The treaty was concluded by William Bradford Reed, who Reed developed some of the roots of the Open Door Policy that came to fruition 40 years later.

The Fillmore administration was particularly active in Asia and the Pacific, especially with regard to Japan, which at this time still prohibited nearly all foreign contact. American businessmen wanted Japan "opened up" for trade, and businessmen and the navy alike wanted the ability to visit Japan to stock up on provisions such as coal. Many Americans were also concerned by the fate of shipwrecked American sailors, who were treated as criminals in Japan. Fillmore began planning an expedition to Japan in 1850, but the expedition, led by Commodore Matthew C. Perry, did not leave until November 1852. During the Pierce administration, Perry signed a modest trade treaty with the Japanese shogunate which was successfully ratified. Marcy selected the first American consul to Japan, Townsend Harris, who helped further expand trade between Japan and the United States. The Perry Expedition ended the period of Japanese isolation and set in motion events that would ultimately lead to the Meiji Restoration. Perry also advocated the American colonization of Taiwan, Okinawa, and the Bonin Islands, but the Pierce administration did not endorse Perry's proposals.

== Other events and incidents ==
=== Treaty with New Granada ===
Polk's ambassador to the Republic of New Granada, Benjamin Alden Bidlack, negotiated the Mallarino–Bidlack Treaty with the government of New Granada. Though Bidlack had initially only sought to remove tariffs on American goods, Bidlack and New Granadan Foreign Minister Manuel María Mallarino negotiated a broader agreement that deepened military and trade ties between the two countries. The treaty also allowed for the construction of the Panama Railway. In an era of slow overland travel, the treaty gave the United States a route to more rapidly travel between its eastern and western coasts. In exchange, Bidlack agreed to have the United States guarantee New Granada's sovereignty over the Isthmus of Panama. The treaty won ratification in both countries in 1848. The agreement helped to establish a stronger American influence in the region, as the Polk administration sought to ensure that Great Britain would not dominate Central America. The United States would use the Mallarino-Bidlack Treaty as justification for numerous military interventions in the 19th century.

=== Lajos Kossuth ===
A much-publicized event of Fillmore's presidency was the arrival in late 1851 of Lajos Kossuth, the exiled leader of a failed Hungarian revolution against Austria. Kossuth wanted the U.S. to recognize Hungary's independence. Many Americans were sympathetic to the Hungarian rebels, especially recent German immigrants, who were now coming to the U.S. in large numbers and had become a major political force. Kossuth was feted by Congress, and Fillmore allowed a White House meeting after receiving word that Kossuth would not try to politicize it. In spite of his promise, Kossuth made a speech promoting his cause. The American enthusiasm for Kossuth petered out, and he departed for Europe; Fillmore refused to change American policy, remaining neutral.

=== Paraguay expedition ===
In 1858, Buchanan ordered the Paraguay expedition to punish Paraguay for firing on the USS Water Witch, which was on a scientific mission. The punitive expedition resulted in a Paraguayan apology and the payment of an indemnity.
