= United States non-interventionism =

Type of diplomatic policy

United States non-interventionism primarily refers to the foreign policy that was eventually applied by the United States between the late 18th century and the first half of the 20th century, whereby it sought to avoid alliances with other nations in order to prevent itself from being drawn into wars that were not related to the direct territorial self-defense of the United States. Neutrality and non-interventionism found support among both the elite and popular opinion in the United States, which varied depending on the international context and the country's interests. At times, the degree and nature of this policy was better known as isolationism, such as the interwar period, while some consider the term isolationism to be a pejorative used to discredit non-interventionist policy.

It is key to decipher between the terms isolationism and non-interventionism as they represent two distinct types of foreign policy. Isolationism is the act of completely disengaging from any global affairs such as military alliances, international organisations and economic treaties. Whereas non-interventionism, although also opposed to military engagement, still allows for diplomatic and economic relations with the rest of the world. This can be seen during the build up to World War II, where non-interventionists opposed direct military involvement in Europe whilst supporting them with economic aid such as the Lend Lease Act.

Due to the start of the Cold War in the aftermath of World War II and the rise of the United States as a global superpower, its traditional foreign policy turned towards American imperialism with diplomatic and military interventionism, engaging or somehow intervening in virtually any overseas armed conflict ever since, and concluding multiple bilateral and regional military alliances, chiefly the North Atlantic Treaty Organization. Non-interventionist policies have had continued support from some Americans since World War II, mostly regarding specific armed conflicts in Korea, Vietnam, Syria, and Ukraine.

== Background ==
Robert Walpole, Britain's first Whig prime minister, proclaimed in 1723: "My politics are to keep free from all engagements as long as we possibly can." He emphasized economic advantage and rejected the idea of intervening in European affairs to maintain a balance of power. Walpole's position was known to Americans. However, during the American Revolution, the Second Continental Congress debated about forming an alliance with France. It rejected non-interventionism when it was apparent that the American Revolutionary War could be won in no other manner than a military alliance with France, which Benjamin Franklin successfully negotiated in 1778.

After Britain and France went to war in 1792, George Washington declared neutrality, with unanimous support of his cabinet, after deciding that the treaty with France of 1778 did not apply. Secretary of the Treasury Alexander Hamilton concurred, arguing in Pacificus 2 that the treaty stipulated a defensive alliance, and not an offensive one. Washington's Farewell Address of 1796 explicitly announced the policy of American non-interventionism:

The great rule of conduct for us, in regard to foreign nations, is in extending our commercial relations, to have with them as little political connection as possible. Europe has a set of primary interests, which to us have none, or a very remote relation. Hence she must be engaged in frequent controversies the causes of which are essentially foreign to our concerns. Hence, therefore, it must be unwise in us to implicate ourselves, by artificial ties, in the ordinary vicissitudes of her politics, or the ordinary combinations and collisions of her friendships or enmities.

== No entangling alliances (19th century) ==
President Thomas Jefferson extended Washington's ideas about foreign policy in his March 4, 1801 inaugural address. Jefferson said that one of the "essential principles of our government" is that of "peace, commerce, and honest friendship with all nations, entangling alliances with none." He also stated that "Commerce with all nations, alliance with none", should be the motto of the United States. Extending at times into isolationism, both Jefferson and Madison also practiced the boycotting of belligerent nations with the Embargo Act of 1807.

In 1823, President James Monroe articulated what would come to be known as the Monroe Doctrine, which some have interpreted as non-interventionist in intent: "In the wars of the European powers, in matters relating to themselves, we have never taken part, nor does it comport with our policy, so to do. It is only when our rights are invaded, or seriously menaced that we resent injuries, or make preparations for our defense." It was applied to Hawaii in 1842 in support of eventual annexation there, and to support U.S. expansion on the North American continent.

During the Hungarian Revolution of 1848–1849, the United States adhered to its formal policy of non-intervention while offering diplomatic support to the Hungarian cause. American public opinion overwhelmingly favored the revolutionaries. President Zachary Taylor expressed sympathy for the "Magyar patriots," and the U.S. Congress debated resolutions in their favor. The Austrian Empire's suppression of the revolution—bolstered by Russian military intervention—sparked outrage in the United States and led to a heated diplomatic exchange between Austrian Ambassador Johann Von Hülsemann and Secretary of State Daniel Webster, who defended America’s right to comment on foreign affairs. Though the U.S. declined to recognize Hungarian independence or offer military aid, it secured the release of Hungarian leader Lajos Kossuth from Ottoman custody and welcomed him on a celebrated tour of the United States.

After Tsar Alexander II put down the 1863 January Uprising in Poland, French Emperor Napoleon III asked the United States to "join in a protest to the Tsar." Secretary of State William H. Seward declined, "defending 'our policy of non-intervention—straight, absolute, and peculiar as it may seem to other nations,'" and insisted that "[t]he American people must be content to recommend the cause of human progress by the wisdom with which they should exercise the powers of self-government, forbearing at all times, and in every way, from foreign alliances, intervention, and interference."

President Ulysses S. Grant attempted to annex the Dominican Republic in 1870, but failed to get the support of the Radical Republicans in the Senate. The United States' policy of non-intervention was wholly abandoned with the Spanish–American War, followed by the Philippine–American War from 1899 to 1902.

== 20th century non-interventionism ==
Wake Up, America! Civilization Calls, poster by James Montgomery Flagg, 1917

President Theodore Roosevelt's administration is credited with inciting the Panamanian Revolt against Colombia, completed November 1903, in order to secure construction rights for the Panama Canal (begun in 1904).

President Woodrow Wilson was able to navigate neutrality in World War I for about three years, and to win 1916 reelection with the slogan "He kept us out of war." The neutrality policy was supported by the tradition of shunning foreign entanglements, and by the large population of immigrants from Europe with divided loyalties in the conflict. America did enter the war in April 1917, however. Congress voted to declare war on Germany, 373 to 50 in the House of Representatives and 82 to 6 in the Senate. Technically the US joined the side of the Triple Entente only as an "associated power" fighting the same enemy, not as officially allied with the Entente.

A few months after the declaration of war, Wilson gave a speech to Congress outlining his aims for conclusion of the conflict, labeled the Fourteen Points. That American proclamation was less triumphalist than the stated aims of some other belligerents, and its final point proposed that a "general association of nations must be formed under specific covenants for the purpose of affording mutual guarantees of political independence and territorial integrity to great and small states alike." After the war, Wilson traveled to Europe and remained there for months to labor on the post-war treaty, longer than any previous Presidential sojourn outside the country. In that Treaty of Versailles, Wilson's "general association of nations" was formulated as the League of Nations.

=== Isolationism between the World Wars ===
In the wake of the First World War, the non-interventionist tendencies gained ascendancy. The Treaty of Versailles, and thus, United States' participation in the League of Nations, even with reservations, was rejected by the Senate in the final months of Wilson's presidency. Republican Senate leader Henry Cabot Lodge supported the Treaty with reservations to be sure Congress had final authority on sending the U.S. into war. Wilson and his Democratic supporters rejected the Lodge Reservations.

The strongest opposition to American entry into the League of Nations came from the Senate where a tight-knit faction known as the Irreconcilables, led by William Borah and George Norris, had great objections regarding the clauses of the treaty which compelled America to come to the defense of other nations. Senator William Borah, of Idaho, declared that it would "purchase peace at the cost of any part of our [American] independence." Senator Hiram Johnson, of California, denounced the League of Nations as a "gigantic war trust." While some of the sentiment was grounded in adherence to Constitutional principles, most of the sentiment bore a reassertion of nativist and inward-looking policy.

American society in the interwar period was characterized by a division in values between urban and rural areas as Americans in urban areas tended to be liberal while those in rural areas tended to be conservative. Adding to the division was that Americans in rural areas tended to be Protestant of British and/or German descent while those in urban areas were often Catholic or Jewish and came from eastern or southern Europe. The rural-urban divide was seen most dramatically in the intense debate about Prohibition as urban Americans tended to be "wets" while rural Americans tended to be "drys". The way that American society was fractured along an urban-rural divide served to distract public attention from foreign affairs.

In the 1920s, the State Department had about 600 employees in total with an annual budget of $2 million, which reflected a lack of interest on the part of Congress in foreign affairs. The State Department was very much an elitist body that recruited mostly from graduates of the select "Ivy League" universities, which reflected the idea that foreign policy was the concern of elites. Likewise, the feeling that the United States was taking in far too many immigrants from eastern and southern Europe-who were widely depicted in the American media as criminals and revolutionaries-led to laws restricting immigration from Europe. The anti-immigrant mood increased isolationism as the picture of Europe as a place overflowing with dangerous criminals and equally dangerous Communist revolutionaries led to the corresponding conclusion that the United States should have little as possible to do with nations whose peoples were depicted as disagreeable and unpleasant.

The same way that Congress had virtually banned all non-white immigration to the United States likewise led an indifference about the fate of non-white nations such as China and Ethiopia. The debate about Prohibition in the 1920s also encouraged nativist and isolationist feelings as "drys" often engaged in American exceptionalism by arguing that the United States was a uniquely morally pure nation that had banned alcohol, unlike the rest of the world which remained "wet" and was depicted as mired in corruption and decadence.

The United States acted independently to become a major player in the 1920s in international negotiations and treaties. The Harding Administration achieved naval disarmament among the major powers through the Washington Naval Conference in 1921–22. The Dawes Plan refinanced war debts and helped restore prosperity to Germany. In August 1928, fifteen nations signed the Kellogg–Briand Pact, brainchild of American secretary of state Frank Kellogg and French Foreign Minister Aristide Briand. This pact that was said to have outlawed war and showed the United States commitment to international peace had its semantic flaws.

For example, it did not hold the United States to the conditions of any existing treaties, it still allowed European nations the right to self-defense, and it stated that if one nation broke the Pact, it would be up to the other signatories to enforce it. Briand had sent a message on 6 April 1927 to mark the 10th anniversary of the American declaration of war on Germany in 1917 proposing that France and the United States sign a non-aggression pact.

Briand was attempting to create a Franco-American alliance to counter Germany as Briand envisioned turning the negotiations for the non-aggression pact into some sort of alliance. Kellogg had no interest in an alliance with France, and countered with a vague offer for a treaty to ban all war. The Kellogg–Briand Pact was more of a sign of good intentions on the part of the US, rather than a legitimate step towards the sustenance of world peace.

Another reason for isolationism was the belief that the Treaty of Versailles was too harsh towards Germany and the question of war debts to the United States. American public opinion was especially hostile towards France, which was depicted in the words of the Republican senator Reed Smoot who in August 1930 called France a greedy "Shylock" intent upon taking the last "pound of flesh" from Germany via reparations while refusing to pay its war debts to the United States.

In the early 1930s, French diplomats at the embassy in Washington stated that the image of France was at an all-time low in the United States, with American public opinion being especially incensed by France's decision to default on its war debts on 15 December 1932. French diplomats throughout the interwar period complained that the German embassy and consulates in the United States waged a slick, well funded propaganda campaign designed to persuade the Americans that the Treaty of Versailles was a monstrous, unjust peace treaty while the French embassy and consulates did nothing equivalent to make the case for France. The effect of German propaganda tended to persuade many Americans it had been a huge mistake to have declared war on Germany in 1917 and it would be wrong for the United States to go to war to maintain the international order created by the Treaty of Versailles.

The economic depression that ensued after the Crash of 1929, also continued to abet non-intervention. The attention of the country focused mostly on addressing the problems of the national economy. Isolationism fit the national mood of the 1930s, as the economic crisis led to a lack of willingness to extend the resources to others, this combined with the ongoing issue of the allies failing to pay back their war debts created disillusionment on the benefit of foreign interventions to actually accomplish anything other than profiting imperialists.

The rise of aggressive imperialist policies by Fascist Italy and the Empire of Japan led to conflicts such as the Italian conquest of Ethiopia and the Japanese invasion of Manchuria. These events led to ineffectual condemnations by the League of Nations. Official American response was muted. America also did not take sides in the brutal Spanish Civil War and withdrew its troops from Haiti with the inauguration of the Good Neighbor Policy in 1934. In an attempt to influence American public opinion into taking a more favorable view of France, the Quai d'Orsay founded in 1935 the Association our la Constitution aux Etats-Unis d'un Office Français de Renseignements based in New York, a cultural propaganda council designed to give Americans a more favorable image of France. Better known as the French Information Center, the group created a French Cinema Center to distribution of French films in the United States and by 1939 had handled out for free about 5,000 copies of French films to American universities and high schools.

The French Information Center provided briefings to American journalists and columnists about the French point of view with the emphasis upon France as a democracy that had potential powerful enemies in the form of totalitarian dictatorships such as Germany and Italy. Such propaganda did not seek to challenge American isolationism directly, but the prevailing theme was that France and the United States as democracies had more in common than what divided them. By 1939, René Doynel de Saint-Quentin, the French ambassador in Washington reported that image of France was much higher than what it had been in 1932.

During this period, a significant proportion of non-interventionist sentiment in the United States was shaped as a result of women's peace organisations. For instance a key organisation was the Women's International League for Peace and Freedom (WILPF). It was a group of female pacifists who were against the U.S intervention in World War 1. Key African American women activists include Addie Hunton, Mary Church Terrel and Maude White Katz. They were significant as their membership was made up of women from diverse backgrounds such as African American Women. They altered the trajectory of the organisations goals, as they argued that you can challenge U.S Imperialism abroad without solving the domestic issues of race equality at home.

=== Non-interventionism before entering World War II ===
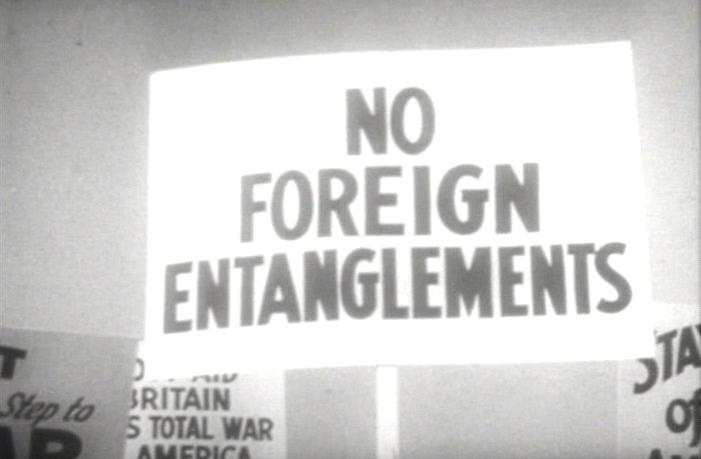
A protest march against American involvement in World War II, before the attack on Pearl Harbor

As Europe moved closer to war in the late 1930s, the United States Congress continued to demand American neutrality. Between 1936 and 1937, much to the dismay of President Franklin D. Roosevelt, Congress passed the Neutrality Acts. For example, in the final Neutrality Act, Americans could not sail on ships flying the flag of a belligerent nation or trade arms with warring nations. Such activities had played a role in American entrance into World War I.

On 1 September 1939, Germany invaded Poland, marking the start of World War II, and the United Kingdom and France subsequently declared war on Germany. In an address to the American people two days later, Roosevelt assured the nation that he would do all he could to keep them out of war. "When peace has been broken anywhere, the peace of all countries everywhere is in danger," Roosevelt said. Even though he was intent on neutrality as the official policy of the United States, he still echoed the dangers of staying out of this war. He also cautioned the American people to not let their wish to avoid war at all costs supersede the security of the nation.

The war in Europe split the American people into two camps: non-interventionists and interventionists. The two sides argued over America's involvement in this World War II. The basic principle of the interventionist argument was fear of German invasion. One of the rhetorical criticisms of interventionism was that it was driven by the so-called merchants of death - businesses who had profited from World War I lobbying for involvement in order to profit from another large war. By the summer of 1940, France suffered a stunning defeat by Germans, and Britain was the only democratic enemy of Germany. In a 1940 speech, Roosevelt argued, "Some, indeed, still hold to the now somewhat obvious delusion that we … can safely permit the United States to become a lone island … in a world dominated by the philosophy of force."

A Life survey published in July found that in the summer of 1940, 67% of Americans believed that a German-Italian victory would endanger the United States, that if such an event occurred 88% supported "arm[ing] to the teeth at any expense to be prepared for any trouble", and that 71% favored "the immediate adoption of compulsory military training for all young men". The magazine wrote that the survey showed "the emergence of a majority attitude very different from that of six or even three months ago".

Ultimately, the ideological rift between the ideals of the United States and the goals of the fascist powers empowered the interventionist argument. Writer Archibald MacLeish asked, "How could we sit back as spectators of a war against ourselves?" In an address to the American people on December 29, 1940, Roosevelt said, "the Axis not merely admits but proclaims that there can be no ultimate peace between their philosophy of government and our philosophy of government."

There were still many who held on to non-interventionism. Much non-interventionist sentiment was in the Midwest region. Although a minority, they had a powerful presence in Congress and could delay interventionist efforts. Pro-German or anti-British (particularly among Irish-Americans) opinion contributed to non-interventionism. Roosevelt's national share of the 1940 presidential vote declined by seven percentage points from 1936. Of the 20 counties in which his share declined by 35 points or more, 19 were largely German-speaking. Of the 35 counties in which his share declined by 25 to 34 points, German was the largest or second-largest original nationality in 31.

Non-interventionists rooted a significant portion of their arguments in historical precedent, citing events such as Washington's farewell address and the failure of World War I. Many subscribed to the idea of a Fortress America: "If we have strong defenses and understand and believe in what we are defending, we need fear nobody in this world," Robert Maynard Hutchins, President of the University of Chicago, wrote in a 1940 essay. Isolationists believed that the safety of the nation was more important than any foreign war.

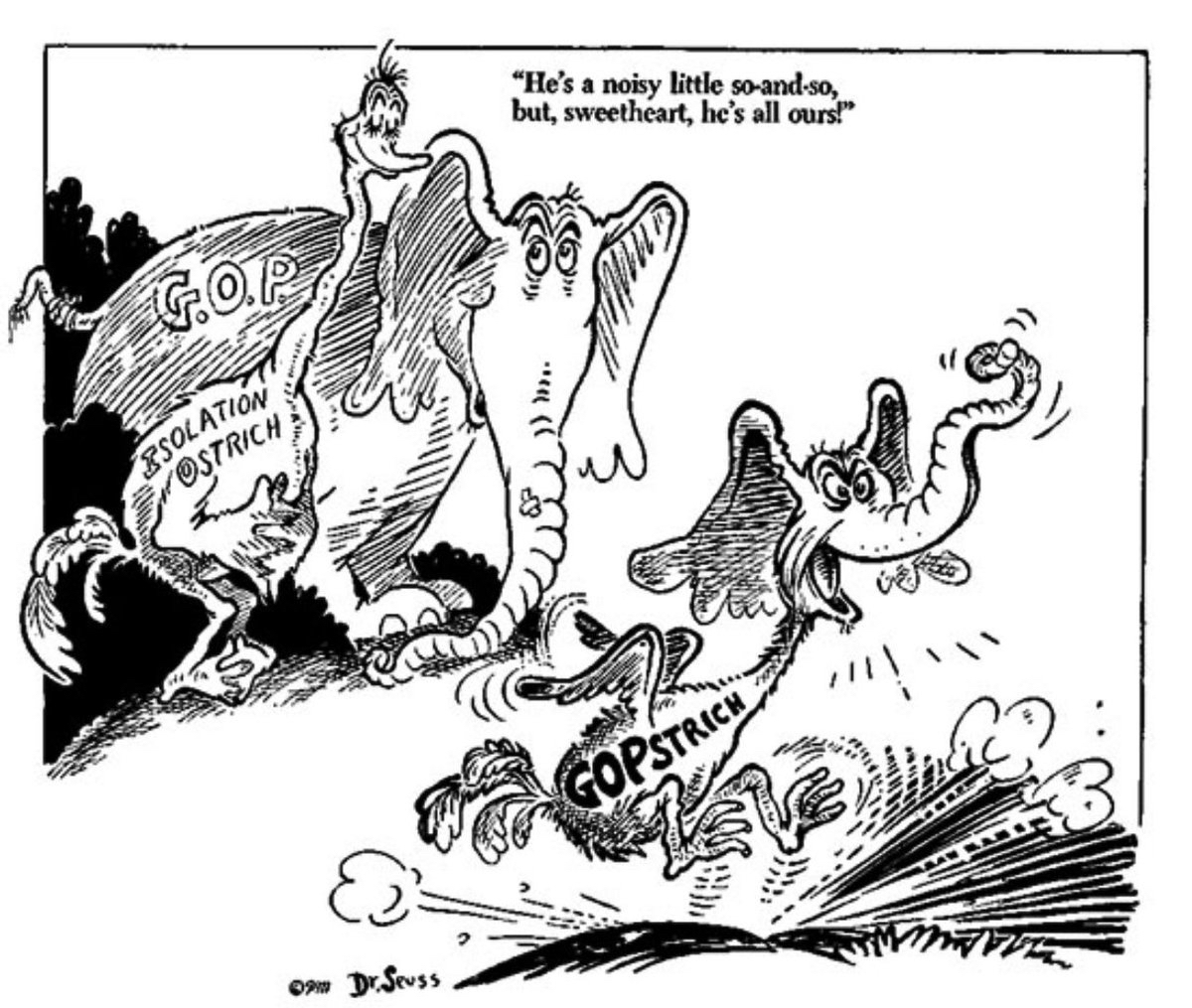
In 1941, Dr. Seuss drew a caricature of the GOPstrich, the squawking child of the isolationists and the Republican Party, both of whom wanted to stay out of the war.

As 1940 became 1941, the actions of the Roosevelt administration made it more and more clear that the United States was on a course to war. This policy shift, driven by the President, was done in multiple actions. The first came in 1939 with the passage of the Fourth Neutrality Act, which permitted the United States to trade arms with belligerent nations, as long as these nations came to America to retrieve the arms, and pay for them in cash. This policy was quickly dubbed, 'Cash and Carry.'

In the "destroyers-for-bases" deal, Roosevelt traded destroyers to the British in exchange for strategic bases in Bermuda. Later, the first peacetime conscription came after the fall of France.

The most important interventionist action was the Lend-Lease Act of early 1941. This act allowed the President "to lend, lease, sell, or barter arms, ammunition, food, or any 'defense article' or any 'defense information' to 'the government of any country whose defense the President deems vital to the defense of the United States.'" American public opinion supported Roosevelt's actions. As United States involvement in the Battle of the Atlantic grew with incidents such as the sinking of the USS Reuben James (DD-245), by late 1941 72% of Americans agreed that "the biggest job facing this country today is to help defeat the Nazi Government", and 70% thought that defeating Germany was more important than staying out of the war.

After the attack on Pearl Harbor caused America to enter the war in December 1941, isolationists such as Charles Lindbergh's America First Committee and Herbert Hoover announced their support of the war effort. Isolationist families' sons fought in the war as much as others.

Propaganda activities conducted by German embassy staff such as George Sylvester Viereck, assisted by isolationist politicians such as Hamilton Fish III, were investigated and dampened by federal prosecutors before and after U.S. joined WWII. In 1941, Fish was implicated in the America First Committee franking controversy, whereby isolationist politicians were found to be using their free mailing privileges to aid the German propaganda campaign. William Power Maloney's grand jury investigated Nazi penetration in the United States and secured convictions of Viereck and George Hill, Fish's chief of staff.

=== Non-interventionism after World War II ===
Ohio Senator Robert A. Taft was a leading opponent of interventionism after 1945, although it always played a secondary role to his deep interest in domestic affairs. Historian George Fujii, citing the Taft papers, argues:

Taft fought a mostly losing battle to reduce government expenditures and to curtail or prevent foreign aid measures such as the British loan of 1945 and the Marshall Plan. He feared that these measures would "destroy the freedom of the individual, freedom of States and local communities, freedom of the farmer to run his own farm and the workman to do his own job" (p. 375), thereby threatening the foundations of American prosperity and leading to a "totalitarian state" (p. 377).

In 1951, in the midst of bitter partisan debate over the Korean War, Taft increasingly spoke out on foreign policy issues. According to his biographer James T. Patterson:

Two basic beliefs continued to form a fairly consistent core of Taft's thinking on foreign policy. First, he insisted on limiting America's overseas commitments. [Taft said] "Nobody today can be an isolationist.... The only question is the degree to which we shall take action throughout the entire world." America had obligations that it had to honor – such as NATO – and it could not turn a blind eye to such countries as Formosa or Israel. But the United States had limited funds and problems at home and must therefore curb its commitments....This fear of overcommitment was rooted in Taft's even deeper faith in liberty, which made him shrink from a foreign policy that would cost large sums of money, increase the power of the military, and transform American society into what he called a garrison state.

Norman A. Graebner argues:

Differences over collective security in the G.O.P. were real in 1952, but Taft tried during his pre-convention campaign to moderate his image as a "go-it-aloner" in foreign policy. His whole effort proved unsuccessful, largely because by spring the internationalist camp had a formidable candidate of its own in Dwight D. Eisenhower. As the personification of post-1945 American commitment to collective security, particularly in Europe, General Eisenhower had decided to run because he feared, apparently, that Taft's election would lead to repudiation of the whole collective security effort, including NATO.

Eisenhower won the nomination and secured Taft's support by promising Taft a dominant voice in domestic policies, while Eisenhower's internationalism would set the foreign-policy agenda. Graebner argues that Eisenhower succeeded in moving the conservative Republicans away from their traditional attacks on foreign aid and reciprocal trade policies, and collective security arrangements, to support for those policies. By 1964 the Republican conservatives rallied behind Barry Goldwater who was an aggressive advocate of an anti-communist internationalist foreign policy. Goldwater wanted to roll back Communism and win the Cold War, asking "Why Not Victory?"

== Non-interventionism in the 21st century ==
During the presidency of Barack Obama, some members of the United States federal government, including President Obama and Secretary of State John Kerry, considered intervening militarily in the Syrian Civil War. A poll from late April 2013 found that 62% of Americans thought that the "United States has no responsibility to do something about the fighting in Syria between government forces and antigovernment groups", with only twenty-five percent disagreeing with that statement.

A writer for The New York Times referred to this as "an isolationist streak," a characterization international relations scholar Stephen Walt strongly objected to, calling the description "sloppy journalism." According to Walt, "the overwhelming majority of people who have doubts about the wisdom of deeper involvement in Syria—including yours truly—are not 'isolationist.' They are merely sensible people who recognize that we may not have vital interests there, that deeper involvement may not lead to a better outcome and could make things worse, and who believe that the last thing the United States needs to do is to get dragged into yet another nasty sectarian fight in the Arab/Islamic world."

In December 2013, the Pew Research Center reported that their newest poll, "American's Place in the World 2013," had revealed that 52 percent of respondents in the national poll said that the United States "should mind its own business internationally and let other countries get along the best they can on their own." This was the most people to answer that question this way in the history of the question, one which pollsters began asking in 1964. Only about a third of respondents felt this way a decade ago.

A July 2014 poll of "battleground voters" across the United States found "77 percent in favor of full withdrawal from Afghanistan by the end of 2016; only 15 percent and 17 percent interested in more involvement in Syria and Ukraine, respectively; and 67 percent agreeing with the statement that, 'U.S. military actions should be limited to direct threats to our national security.'"

Polls indicate growing impatience among Americans with the war in Ukraine, with 2023 polls showing just 17% of Americans think their country is "not doing enough" to support Ukraine. This percentage is the lowest since the war began.

== Conservative and libertarian policies ==
Rathbun (2008) compares three separate themes in conservative policies since the 1980s: conservatism, neoconservatism, and isolationism. These approaches are similar in that they all invoked the mantle of "realism" and pursued foreign policy goals designed to promote national interests. Conservatives were the only group that was "realist" in the academic sense in that they defined the national interest narrowly, strove for balances of power internationally, viewed international relations as amoral, and especially valued sovereignty.

By contrast, neoconservatives based their foreign policy on nationalism, and isolationists sought to minimize any involvement in foreign affairs and raise new barriers to immigration. Former Republican Congressman Ron Paul favored a return to the non-interventionist policies of Thomas Jefferson and frequently opposed military intervention in countries like Iran and Iraq.

After Russia's full-scale invasion of Ukraine, the Republican Party has been divided on Ukraine's aid, believing that it is not in the interests of the United States to get involved in a "proxy war" against Russia. President Donald Trump has called on the United States to push for peace talks rather than continue to support Ukraine.

== Supporters of non-interventionism ==
=== Politicians ===
==== Deceased ====
- Howard Buffett (1903–1964), U.S. Representative from Nebraska
- Calvin Coolidge (1872–1933), 30th U.S. President, 29th U.S. Vice President, 48th U.S. Governor of Massachusetts, 46th U.S. Lt. Governor of Massachusetts
- Mike Gravel (1930–2021), former US senator from Alaska (1969–1981), Entered the Pentagon Papers into Public Record in 1971, Democratic Presidential Candidate in 2008 and 2020. Founder of the Gravel Institute think tank
- Herbert Hoover (1874–1964), 31st U.S. President, 3rd United States Secretary of Commerce
- William Langer (1886–1959), U.S. Senator from North Dakota
- Louis Ludlow (1873–1950), U.S. Representative from Indiana pushed for the Ludlow Amendment
- Henrik Shipstead (1881–1960), U.S. Senator from Minnesota, also a member of the America First Committee
- Robert A. Taft (1889–1953), U.S. Senator from Ohio, Senate Majority Leader, 1940, 1948 & 1952 Republican presidential candidate

==== Living ====
- Justin Amash, former U.S. Representative from Michigan, 2020 Libertarian presidential candidate
- Eric Brakey, former U.S. State Senator from Maine, 2018 Republican U.S. Senate candidate
- Tulsi Gabbard, former U.S. Representative from Hawaii (2013–2021)
- Gary Johnson, 29th Governor of New Mexico (1995–2003), 2012 and 2016 Libertarian Presidential Nominee
- Thomas Massie, U.S. Representative from Kentucky
- Ron Paul, former U.S. Representative from Texas, 1988, 2008, & 2012 Republican presidential candidate; Paul's stance on foreign policy is one of consistent non-intervention, opposing wars of aggression and entangling alliances with other nations.
- Rand Paul, U.S. Senator from Kentucky, 2016 Republican presidential candidate, the son of Ron Paul
- Bernie Sanders, U.S. Senator from Vermont, 2016 and 2020 Democratic presidential candidate
- Marjorie Taylor Greene, former U.S. Representative from Georgia (2021–2026).

=== Government officials ===
- Michael Scheuer, former CIA intelligence officer & former chief of the Bin Laden Issue Station, professor at Georgetown University, blogger, political commentator

=== Public figures ===
- Karen Kwiatkowski, retired Lt. Col. of the United States Air Force, 2012 Republican U.S. Representative candidate from Virginia, whistleblower from the Pentagon
- Tucker Carlson, television personality
- Scott Horton, American radio host and author

=== Organizations and publications ===
- Cato Institute
- Defense Priorities
- Mises Institute
- Quincy Institute for Responsible Statecraft
- The American Conservative

== Criticism ==
In his World Policy Journal review of Bill Kauffman's 1995 book America First! Its History, Culture, and Politics, Benjamin Schwartz described America's history of isolationism as a tragedy and being rooted in Puritan thinking.

== See also ==
- America First
- American nationalism
- Empire of Liberty
- Interventionism
  - Foreign interventions by the United States
- Isolationism
- Ludlow Amendment
- Little Englander
- Pacifism in the United States
- Realpolitik
- United States militarism

== References and further reading ==
- Adler, Selig. The Isolationist Impulse: Its Twentieth Century Reaction. (1957).; says it's based on economic self-sufficiency and the illusion of security, together with Irish and German ethnic factors.
- Aregood, Richard, Richard Shafer, and Eric Freedman. "American Isolationism and The Political Evolution of Journalist-Turned-US Senator Gerald P. Nye." Journalism Practice 9.2 (2015): 279–294.
- Artiukhov A. A. The Conceptual Characteristics of the Notion “Isolationism” at the Current Historical Stage / A. A. Artiukhov // Meždunarodnyj Naučno-Issledovatel'skij Žurnal [International Research Journal]. – 2022. – № 8 (122). – DOI 10.23670/IRJ.2022.122.54.
- Cole, Wayne S. America First: The Battle Against Intervention, 1940–1941 (1953), the standard history.
- Cooper, John Milton Jr. The Vanity of Power: American Isolationism and the First World War, 1914–1917 (1969).
- Divine, Robert A. The Illusion Of Neutrality (1962) scholarly history of neutrality legislation in 1930s. online free to borrow
- Doenecke, Justus D. "American Isolationism, 1939-1941" Journal of Libertarian Studies, Summer/Fall 1982, 6(3), pp. 201–216.
- Doenecke, Justus D. "Explaining the Antiwar Movement, 1939-1941: The Next Assignment" Journal of Libertarian Studies, Winter 1986, 8(1), pp. 139–162.
- Doenecke, Justus D. "Literature of Isolationism, 1972-1983: A Bibliographic Guide" Journal of Libertarian Studies, Spring 1983, 7(1), pp. 157–184.
- Doenecke, Justus D. "Anti-Interventionism of Herbert Hoover" Journal of Libertarian Studies, Summer 1987, 8(2), pp. 311–340.
- Doenecke, Justus D. "Non-interventionism of the Left: the Keep America Out of the War Congress, 1938-41." Journal of Contemporary History 12.2 (1977): 221–236.
- Dunn, David. "Isolationism revisited: seven persistent myths in the contemporary American foreign policy debate." Review of International Studies 31.02 (2005): 237–261.
- Fisher, Max. "American isolationism just hit a 50-year high. Why that matters." washingtonpost. com/blogs/worldviews/wp/2013/12/04/american-isolationism-just-hit-a-50-year-high-why-that-matters Washington Post. Dec 12, 2013.
- Gilbert, Felix. "The English Background of American Isolationism in the Eighteenth Century." William and Mary Quarterly: A Magazine of Early American History (1944): 138–160. in JSTOR
- Guinsburg, Thomas N. The Pursuit of Isolationism in the United States from Versailles to Pearl Harbor (1982).
- Johnstone, Andrew. "Isolationism and internationalism in American foreign relations." Journal of Transatlantic Studies 9.1 (2011): 7-20.
- Jonas, Manfred. "Isolationism" Encyclopedia of the New American Nation, online
- Jonas, Manfred. Isolationism in America, 1935-1941 (1966).
- Kertzer, Joshua D. "Making sense of isolationism: foreign policy mood as a multilevel phenomenon." Journal of Politics 75.01 (2013): 225-240.
- Kupchan, Charles A. Isolationism: A History of America's Efforts to Shield Itself from the World (Oxford University Press, USA, 2020). online; also see online review
- Maddow, Rachel. Prequel An American Fight Against Fascism (Crown, 2023).
- Nichols, Christopher McKnight. Promise and Peril: America at the Dawn of a Global Age (Harvard University Press, 2011).
- Romanov V. V., Artyukhov A. A. (2013) The Notion of "Isolationism" in U.S. Foreign-Policy Thought: Conceptual Characteristics / V. V. Romanov, A. A. Artyukhov // Vestnik Vâtskogo Gosudarstvennogo Gumanitarnogo Universiteta. – № 3-1. – pp. 67-71.
- Sevareid, Eric (1978). Between the Wars. New York: Berkley Books. ISBN 978-0-425-03971-7.
- Smith, Glenn H. (1979). Langer of North Dakota: A Study in Isolationism, 1940–1959. ISBN 978-0-8240-3639-3. Senator William Langer
- Young, Robert J. (2005). An Uncertain Idea of France Essays and Reminiscence on the Third Republic. New York: Peter Lang. ISBN 978-0-8204-7481-6.
- Weinberg, Albert K. "The Historical Meaning of the American Doctrine of Isolation." American Political Science Review 34#3 (1940): 539–547. in JSTOR
