= Washington Doctrine of Unstable Alliances =

American realist foreign policy doctrine

The Washington Doctrine of Unstable Alliances, sometimes called the caution against entangling alliances, was an early realist guide for US foreign policy and the nation's interaction with others. According to the policy, the United States should consider external alliances as temporary measures of convenience and freely abandon them when national interest dictates. The policy has been cited as a rare example of an explicit endorsement of what in international relations is known as renversement des alliances ('reversal of alliances'), a state abandoning an ally for an alliance with a recent enemy, sometimes against the former ally.

== Background ==
=== Prelude ===
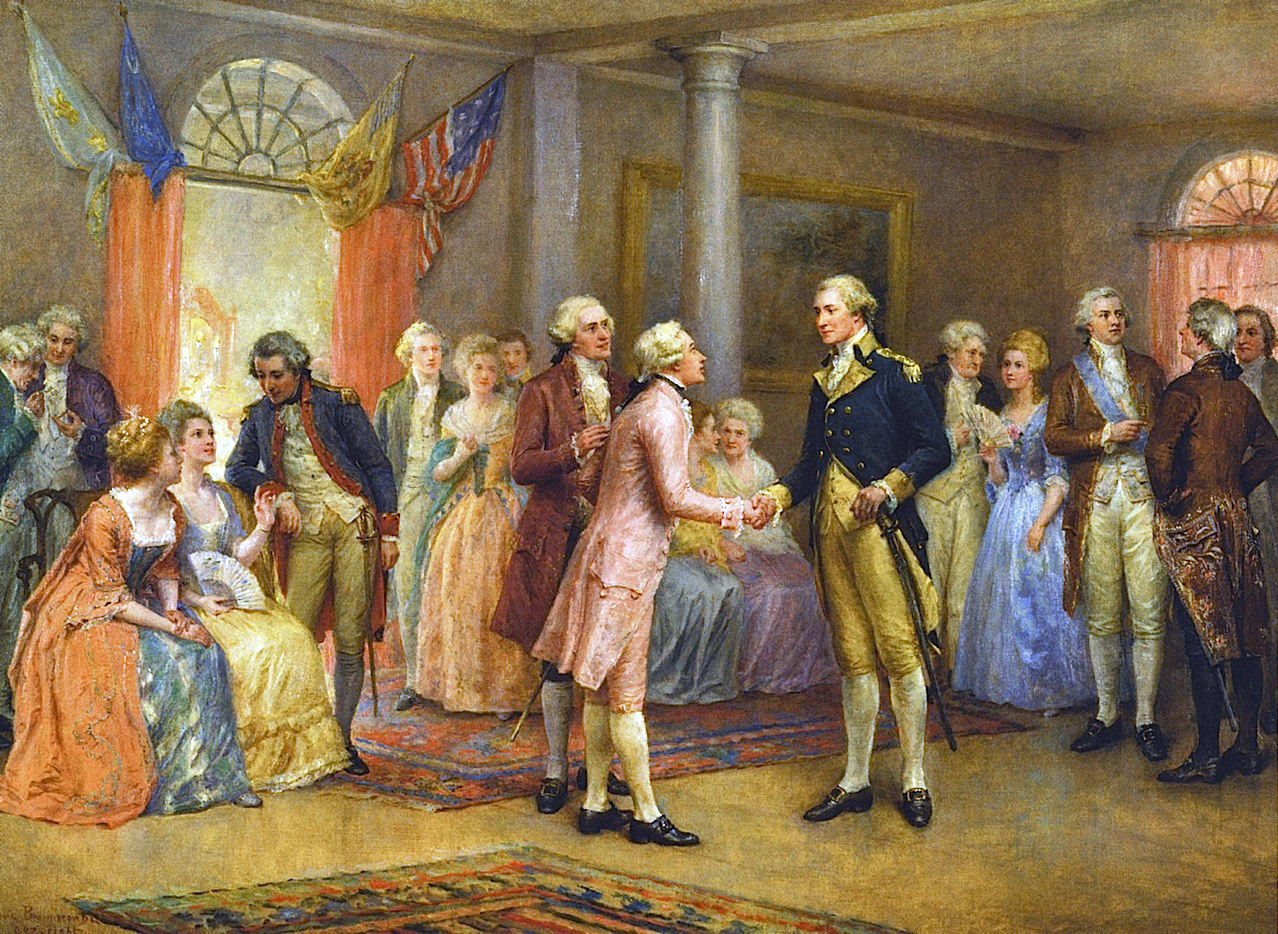
George Washington used a passage in his farewell address to defend his foreign policy toward France.

By 1796, the end of George Washington's eighth year as US President, the United States had a dire strategic position. Interstate rivalries, violent insurrections such as the Whiskey Rebellion, solidifying opposition to the federal government in the form of the Anti-Federalist Party, and the US dependence on trade with Europe weakened the new nation. The increasingly-brittle federal government had been meanwhile held together almost entirely by Washington's charismatic authority.

Receiving counsel from Treasury Secretary Alexander Hamilton, who cautioned the president that "we forget how little we can annoy," Washington became convinced that the United States could not further antagonize the Kingdom of Great Britain and feared the possibility of British-imposed commercial isolation, which would precipitate an economic catastrophe that would "overturn the constitution and put into an overwhelming majority the anti-national forces." At the same time, radical government elements, led by Thomas Jefferson, had all but declared their support for American aid to the beleaguered French First Republic, which was at war with Great Britain. Jefferson mused that Hamilton, who was pro-British, was "panic-struck if we refuse our breach to every kick which Great Britain may choose to give it."

In his valedictory Farewell Address, Washington announced his decision to step down from the presidency, partly because of his increasing weariness with public life, and included a short passage defending his policy of ignoring French requests for American assistance. In an attempt to keep his remarks apolitical, Washington defended his policy by framing it as generic guidance for the future and avoided mentioning the French by name:

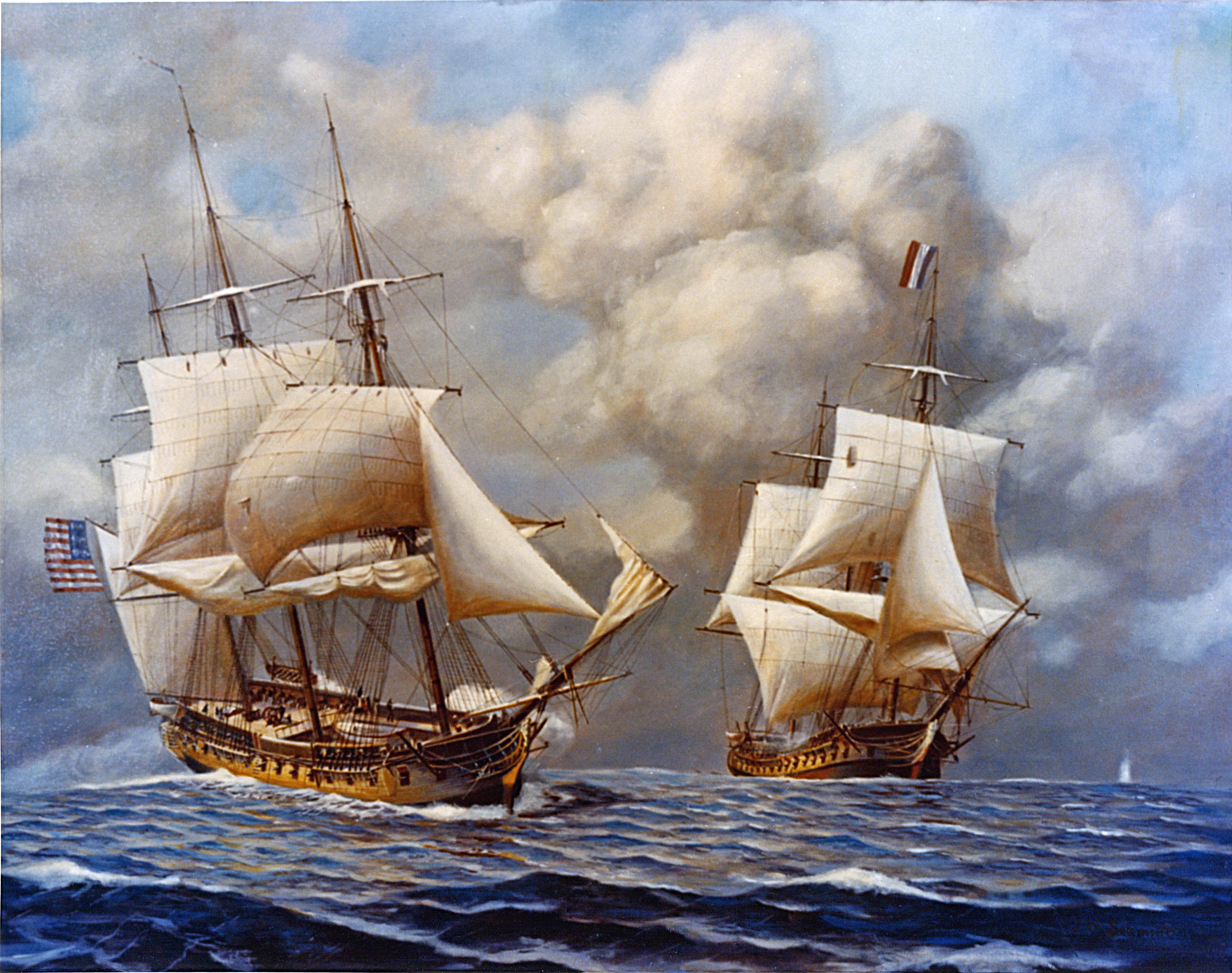
Although the US had been allied with France, the Quasi-War soon after US independence foreshadowed the doctrine of unstable alliances.

The great rule of conduct for us, in regard to foreign nations, is in extending our commercial relations, to have with them as little political connection as possible. Europe has a set of primary interests, which to us have none, or a very remote relation. Hence she must be engaged in frequent controversies the causes of which are essentially foreign to our concerns. Hence, therefore, it must be unwise in us to implicate ourselves, by artificial ties, in the ordinary vicissitudes of her politics, or the ordinary combinations and collisions of her friendships or enmities... it is our true policy to steer clear of permanent alliances with any portion of the foreign world; so far, I mean, as we are now at liberty to do it; for let me not be understood as capable of patronizing infidelity to existing engagements.

— George Washington's Farewell Address

However, in private correspondence about his address, Washington wrote that the geopolitical situation inspiring his advice would disappear in "not... probably more than twenty years."

=== Formalization ===
The rise of Napoleon Bonaparte in France muted Jefferson's "revolutionary romanticism" and his Democratic-Republican Party, which won the 1800 elections. Jefferson came to see the war between France and Britain as a battle between the "tyrant of the land" and the "tyrant of the ocean" and perceived the military objective of both as the moral equivalent of the other. (The president was denounced by the 14-year-old William Cullen Bryant, who called him "Napoleon's slave" and a "willing vassal to imperious France.") Jefferson's developing view of international affairs led him to observe that the US should retreat from intercession in European affairs for which he had been a lukewarm advocate and to pursue a more modest and less committed course. He believed that US commercial power would allow it to pursue an independent course, unfettered by conventional diplomacy, and he wrote to a protégé:

The day is within my time as well as yours, when we may say by what laws other nations treat us on the sea. And we will say it. In the meantime, we wish to let every treaty we have drop off without renewal. We call in our diplomatic missions, barely keeping up those to the more important nations.

A short passage from Thomas Jefferson's 1801 inaugural address has been called the Washington Doctrine of Unstable Alliances.

Outlined by Jefferson in his 1801 inaugural address, the Washington Doctrine of Unstable Alliances asserted that the US should consider its external military alliances to be temporary arrangements of convenience and should freely abandon or reverse them, as indicated by the national interest. Citing the Farewell Address as his inspiration, Jefferson described the doctrine as "peace, commerce, and honest friendship with all nations—entangling alliances with none."

The results of the policy during Jefferson's presidency have been generally criticized. According to the historian Doron Ben-Atar, "Jefferson gambled [that] commerce could be used as an instrument for forcing the belligerent nations to do America justice and to respect the republic's honor." The Embargo Act of 1807, which virtually sealed the US from the outside world, has been cited as the most dramatic example of the failure of Jefferson's "inflated assessment" of US power. Jefferson never fully grasped the failure, which helped lead the US into the War of 1812.

== Significance ==
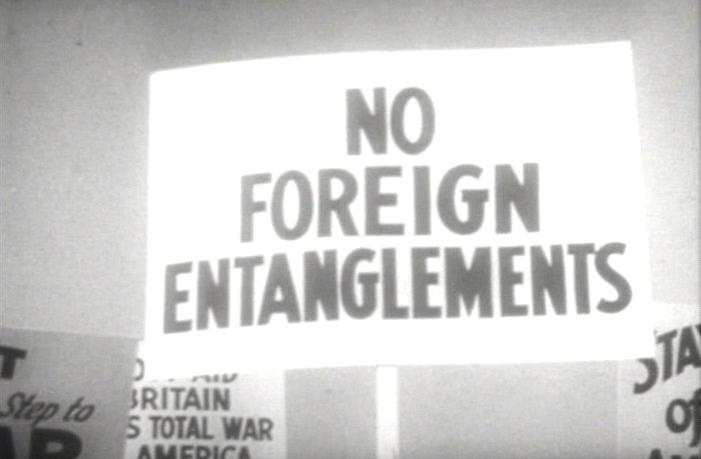
A sign at a demonstration protesting US involvement in World War II paraphrases Jefferson's inaugural address.

The Washington Doctrine of Unstable Alliances is a rare example of a policy endorsement of what is known in international relations as renversement des alliances ("reversal of alliances"), a state abandoning an ally for an alliance with a recent enemy, possibly in opposition to the former ally. The Molotov–Ribbentrop Pact between the Soviet Union and Nazi Germany has been cited as an example.

Although some interpret Washington's advice to apply in the short term, until the geopolitical situation had stabilized, the doctrine has endured as a central argument for American non-interventionism. It would be 165 years after the 1778 Treaty of Alliance with France before the US would negotiate its second permanent military alliance, during World War II. In the interim, the US engaged in transient alliances of convenience, as with Sweden during the Barbary Wars and the European powers and Japan during the Boxer Rebellion. After the US Congress enacted the 1941 Lend-Lease program, Senator Arthur Vandenberg said, "We have torn up 150 years of traditional foreign policy. We have tossed Washington's farewell address into the discard."

According to a critical 1898 New York Times editorial, "The policy... suggested by Jefferson in his first inaugural address has been so faithfully maintained during the century which has since intervened that many of our people regard it as a policy as fixed as the stars in their courses." The American economist Steven Rosefielde noted the doctrine's influence on current policy: "Our nation seeks coalitions and alliances with other nations for tactical purposes when at war, and reserves our overall strategy-making to ourselves."

=== Misattribution ===
The phrase "entangling alliances," which forms the basis of the Washington Doctrine of Unstable Alliances, has been misattributed in the popular press to Washington, rather than Jefferson.

== See also ==
- Proclamation of Neutrality
- History of U.S. foreign policy
