= Pacificus–Helvidius Debates =

1793–94 newspaper disputes

Pacificus–Helvidius Debates

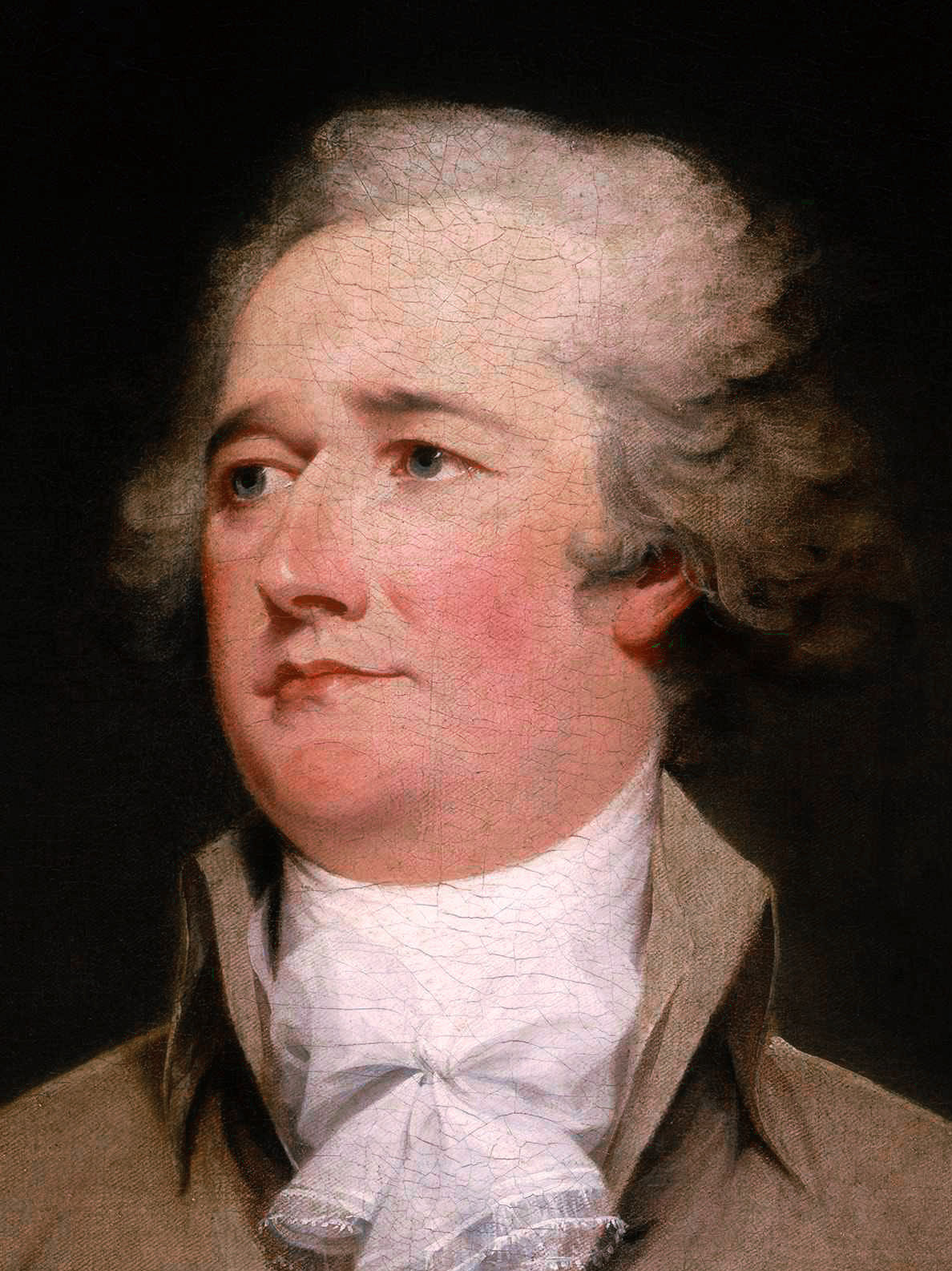
Alexander Hamilton
Pacificus

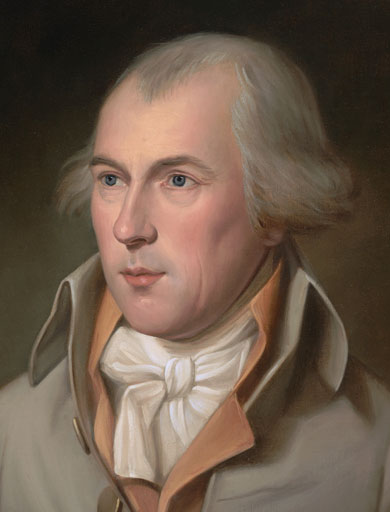
James Madison
Helvidius

The Pacificus–Helvidius Debates were a series of newspaper disputes between American Founding Fathers Alexander Hamilton and James Madison regarding the nature of presidential authority in the wake of George Washington's controversial Proclamation of Neutrality.

Penned between 1793 and 1794, the debates consisted of seven essays by Hamilton, writing as "Pacificus," and five essays by Madison, writing as "Helvidius," published intermittently in the Philadelphia newspaper, Gazette of the United States. The writings serve as a source on the original intent of the Founding Fathers concerning the exercise of executive war powers and as an early basis for the foreign policy of the United States.

== Background ==
Washington's Proclamation of Neutrality, issued on April 22, 1793, prohibiting citizens to "take part in any hostilities in the seas on behalf of or against any of the belligerent powers" had effectively disregarded the 1778 Treaty of Alliance between the United States and France, sparking criticism from Jeffersonian Republicans on the grounds that it violated the separation of powers. As France had provided substantial military aid to the United States during the American Revolutionary War, the proclamation also ignited protests among Americans who wished to effectuate a similar revolution in France. These protests intensified when Edmond-Charles Genêt, a member of the French government, traveled to Philadelphia in the hopes of boosting pro-French sentiments. Then Vice-President John Adams later recounted:

...you certainly never felt the Terrorism, excited by Genet, in 1793. when ten thousand People in the Streets of Philadelphia, day after day, threatened to drag Washington out of his House, and effect a Revolution in the Government, or compell it to declare War in favour of the French Revolution, and against England. The coolest and the firmest Minds, even among the Quakers in Philadelphia, have given their opinions to me, that nothing but the yellow Fever, which removed Dr Hutchinson and Jonathan Dickenson Sargent from this World, could have Saved the United States from a total Revolution of Government.

On June 29, 1793, Hamilton published an essay titled "Defense of the President's Neutrality Proclamation" which supported Washington's use of executive power and criticized the proclamation's opponents. He would go to publish seven more essays under the pseudonym of "Pacificus" arguing in favor of an expansive interpretation of presidential authority. Thomas Jefferson, an opponent of the expansion of government, urged James Madison to respond to Hamilton's essays, which he dubbed "heresies":

Nobody answers him, & his doctrine will therefore be taken for confessed. For god’s sake, my dear Sir, take up your pen, select the most striking heresies, and cut him to peices [sic] in the face of the public. There is nobody else who can & will enter the lists with him. Never in my opinion, was so calamitous an appointment made, as that of the present minister of [France] here.

Though reluctant at first, Madison agreed to respond to Hamilton's publications and wrote five essays between August 24 and September 18 under the name "Helvidius". In them, Madison argued in favor of a strict construction of executive power.

== See also ==
- History of U.S. foreign policy, 1776–1801
