= Maude White Katz =

American communist activist (1908–1985)

Maude White Katz (1908–1985) was a communist activist for the Communist Party USA and wrote about Black women in America. Katz's work helped the party gain insights into the Black working class and their labor conditions. Katz was a worker from a working-class family, and the CPUSA assigned her to several unions during her time with the party. Her input and organizational skills were instrumental to the Party's ability to reach out and organize for the Black working class. Her critiques of the Party gave rise to internal campaigns against white chauvinism. Her party organizing spanned many years over several states and included union organizing and demonstrations. Party leaders saw Katz as a leader in organizing early on, and she was selected by the party to go to the USSR for three years at the Communist University of the Toilers of the East.

== Biography ==
=== Early life ===
Maude Katz was born in Pennsylvania. Her parents and grandparents were originally from Virginia.

Her father worked in the mines after moving to Pennsylvania, then shifted to general construction work, laying pipe, and cleaning outhouses. Facing hard work for little pay, Katz's father developed a drinking problem. Her mother did laundry and other types of work for white families. Katz had 14 brothers and sisters. She was the middle child of all the other children.

== Education ==
Katz went to school in McKeesport, Pennsylvania. While in school, she was a domestic worker for white families and taught on the side. Katz was introduced to radical political ideas in High School by one of her white English teachers, Eleanor Goldsmith, who was a communist. The teacher gave Katz books to read and introduced her to other communists. Her teacher also took her to meetings in Pittsburgh, where White and Black communists would chair meetings together, and speakers would speak against the oppression of Black people. This led Katz to believe that white Communists were sincere in the struggle against Racism.

== Life in Chicago ==
Katz moved to Chicago, Illinois where she lived with her sister, who had an apartment in the city. Katz worked as a domestic laborer in Chicago. Outside of working hours, she would engage in communist party activities, such as handing out leaflets and speaking at open air meetings.

== Travel to USSR ==
Katz was elected to go to the Soviet Union under an exchange program offering scholarships for travel even though she had been a member of the Communist party for less than a year.

Katz's was able to get a university education and also travel during her three year stay at the Soviet Union. She attended the Communist University of the Toilers of the East with other anti-imperialists from across the world, including Harry Haywood.

Katz's studies included Marxism-Leninism, history of the Communist Party of the Soviet Union, the National Question, and Imperialism. She also sat in on official discussions around "The Negro Question" in the U.S. regarding self-determination of Black people in the states.

=== Return from Moscow to New York ===
Katz returned from the Soviet Union in 1930 and picked back up party work for the CPUSA. She wrote articles and organized/took part in demonstrations.

Katz career as a lead member of the Needle Trades Industrial Union started after being assigned to a leadership position by the Communist Party. Her main job in the union was to organize Black workers.

Katz solidified her political position on "white chauvinism" both in and out of the party during her time in the Needle Trades Industrial Union. This was one of the positions that her and Ben Gold took to the Communist Party USA politburo to discuss.

As a result of the politburo meeting, party campaigns against white chauvinism were introduced as well as a call for unity for Black and white workers. The Yokinen Show Trial was also created from this meeting.

Katz worked with William Z. Foster in the Trade Union Unity League.

== The Harlem Liberator ==
Katz served as the editor of The Harlem Liberator, which was an official organ of the League of Struggle for Negro Rights.

== Activism ==
=== Needle Trades Industrial Union ===
Katz was one of the primary organizers with the Needle Trades Industrial Union.

=== National Committee to Free the Ingram Family ===
Katz was the national administrative secretary of the National Committee to Free the Ingram Family. Katz organized such actions as the mass sending of over 10,000 letters, along with a 25,000-signature petition to President Truman to pardon Rosa Lee Ingram in this role.

=== Concerned League of Harlem ===
Katz served as the President of the Concerned League of Harlem. Katz and other members campaigned to open up exams for specialized high schools to Black and Puerto Rican students

=== P.S. 125 Boycott ===
Katz served as chairman of a public school boycott in New York where almost 1,500 students of the 1,850 walked out and joined the boycott.

== Works ==
Katz was known as a prolific writer and wrote for journals related to politics and race.

- Special Negro Demands - Labor Unity Vol. 7, no. 5 (May 1932) pp 10-11
- End Racism in Education: A Concerned Parent Speaks - Freedomways Vol. 8, no. 4 (1968)
