= Proclamation of Neutrality =

1793 American declaration of neutrality

The Proclamation of Neutrality was a formal announcement issued by U.S. President George Washington on April 22, 1793, that declared the nation neutral in the conflict between revolutionary France and Great Britain. It threatened legal proceedings against any American providing assistance to any country at war.

== Background ==
News that Revolutionary France had declared war on Great Britain in February 1793, and with this declaration that France, by the country's own volition, was now at war with all of Europe, did not reach America until the first half of April of that year. President Washington was at Mount Vernon attending the funeral of a nephew when he was given the news. He hurried back to Pennsylvania and summoned a cabinet meeting on April 19. It was unanimously agreed to issue a proclamation "forbidding citizens to take part in any hostilities in the seas, on behalf of or against any of the belligerent powers."

Washington's members agreed that neutrality was essential; the nation was too young and its military was too small to risk any sort of engagement with either France or Britain. Secretary of State Thomas Jefferson, in particular, saw in this question, the influence of the Federalists — his political rivals; yet he too agreed a proclamation was in order, though perhaps not an official one.

In a cabinet meeting of April 19, Thomas Jefferson argued that while neutrality was a sine qua non, there was no real need to make a Proclamation of Neutrality either immediately or even officially; perhaps there might be no need for an official declaration at all. The United States could declare its neutrality for a price, Jefferson intimated, "Why not stall and make countries bid for American neutrality?" In response, Secretary of the Treasury Alexander Hamilton declared that American neutrality was not negotiable. Jefferson eventually resigned from his duty as Secretary of State in disagreement with the Proclamation of Neutrality.

== Text of the proclamation ==
Whereas it appears that a state of war exists between Austria, Prussia, Sardinia, Great Britain, and the United Netherlands of the one part and France on the other, and the duty and interest of the United States require that they should with sincerity and good faith adopt and pursue a conduct friendly and impartial toward the belligerent powers:

I have therefore thought fit by these presents to declare the disposition of the United States to observe the conduct aforesaid toward those powers respectively and to exhort and warn the citizens of the United States carefully to avoid all acts and proceedings whatsoever which may in any manner tend to contravene such disposition.

And I do hereby also make known that whosoever of the citizens of the United States shall render himself liable to punishment or forfeiture under the law of nations by committing, aiding, or abetting hostilities against any of the said powers, or by carrying to any of them those articles which are deemed contraband by the modern usage of nations, will not receive the protection of the United States against such punishment or forfeiture; and further, that I have given instructions to those officers to whom it belongs to cause prosecutions to be instituted against all persons who shall, within the cognizance of the courts of the United States, violate the law of nations with respect to the powers at war, or any of them.

In testimony whereof I have caused the seal of the United States of America to be affixed to these presents, and signed the same with my hand. Done at the city of Philadelphia, the 22nd day of April, one thousand, seven hundred and ninety-three, and of the Independence of the United States of America the seventeenth.

— George Washington

== Debates ==
The proclamation started a war of pamphlets between Alexander Hamilton (writing for the Federalists) and James Madison (writing for the Democratic-Republicans), commonly known as the Pacificus–Helvidius Debates. In his seven essays, written under the pen name "Pacificus", Hamilton dealt with objections to the proclamation. Among his arguments were:

- The decree was, in fact, constitutional; for while Congress has the sole right to declare war, it is "the duty of the executive to preserve peace till the war is declared."
- The Proclamation of Neutrality did not violate the United States' 1778 Treaty of defensive alliance with France, as the Democratic-Republicans were claiming. The treaty, Hamilton pointed out, was a defensive alliance and did not apply to offensive wars, "and it was France that had declared war upon other European powers", not the other way around.
- By siding with France the United States would have left itself open to attacks within American borders by the governments of Great Britain and Spain stirring up "numerous Indian tribes" influenced by these two governments.

Thomas Jefferson (having read several of the "Pacificus" essays) encouraged James Madison to reply. Madison was initially hesitant. From his Virginia plantation, he offered Jefferson excuses as to why he could not write a reply, including that he didn't have the necessary books and papers to refute "Pacificus", that the summer heat was "oppressive", and that he had many house guests who were wearing out their welcome. Ultimately, Madison agreed to Jefferson's request, though afterward, he wrote to him, "I have forced myself in to the task of a reply. I can truly say I find it the most grating one I have ever experienced."

Also from site, George Washington. “Neutrality Proclamation.” George Washington’s Mount Vernon, 22 Apr. 1793, https://www.mountvernon.org/library/digitalhistory/digital-encyclopedia/article/neutrality-proclamation. The Proclamation ignited a fire storm of criticism. Much of the American population sympathized with the cause of revolutionary France. In a series of letters written under the pseudonym of Pacificus, Alexander Hamilton took up the task of defending the administration in the press by arguing that neutrality was in the best interest of the United States. Furthermore, Hamilton asserted that the 1778 Treaty of Alliance was a defensive arrangement that was not applicable in 1793 because France had declared war on its enemies, an offensive act. Aggravated by Hamilton’s claims of broad executive power and frustrated by the language of Randolph’s final draft of the Proclamation, Thomas Jefferson organized a response to Pacificus. At the pleading of his friend and secretary of state, Hamilton’s former Federalist Papers collaborator Congressman James Madison took up the cause of the opposition in a series of letters under the pen name of Helivicus that countered the arguments of Pacificus. Madison and Hamilton provided each side of the growing partisan chasm between the Federalists and the Democratic-Republicans with powerful talking points.

== See also ==
- Washington Doctrine of Unstable Alliances
- The United States and the French Revolutionary and Napoleonic Wars

== In popular culture ==
The debate among Jefferson/Madison and Hamilton regarding the Proclamation is portrayed in the song "Cabinet Battle #2" in the musical Hamilton.
